= Pontic Scythian language =

Extinct Scythian language

Pontic Scythian
- Old Scythian
- Native to: Scythia, Scythia Minor
- Region: Central Asia, West Asia, Eastern Europe
- Ethnicity: Scythians
- Era: 6th-1st centuries BC?
- Language family: Indo-European: Indo-Iranic; Iranic; Eastern Iranic; Scythian; Pontic Scythian

Language codes
- ISO 639-3: xsc
- Glottolog: None
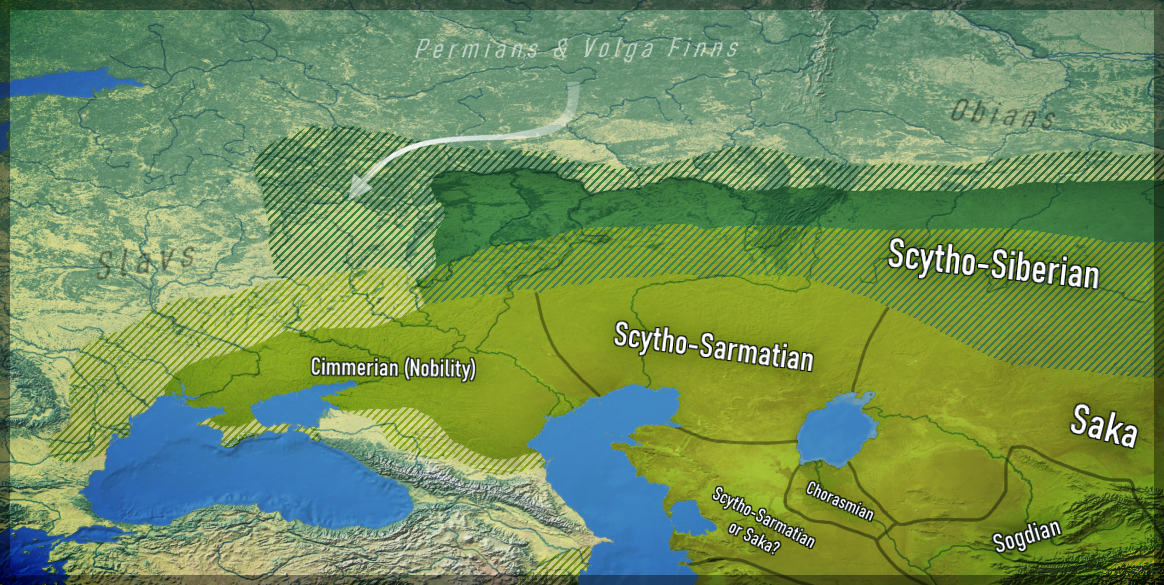
- The approximate distribution of Eastern Iranic languages and peoples in 100 BC appears in green.

Pontic Scythian was a Scythian language formerly spoken in western Asia and eastern Europe between the 6th and 1st centuries BC by the Scythians.

== Phonology ==
The Pontic Scythian language possessed the following phonemes:

Vowels
	Front		Back	
Close	i	iː	u	uː
Mid	eː		oː	
Open		a	aː	

Consonants
	Labial		Dental		Alveolar		Postalveolar		Palatal	Velar		Labiovelar	Glottal
Plosive	p	b	t	d (earliest)						k	ɡ		
Affricate					t͡s		t͡ʃ	d͡ʒ					
Fricative	f		θ	ð (earlier)	s	z	ʃ	ʒ		x		xʷ	h
Sonorant	m		l (later)		n	r			j	(ŋ)		w	

This article uses cursive theta ⟨ϑ⟩ to denote the Scythian voiceless dental fricative (IPA /θ/), and regular theta ⟨θ⟩ to denote the Greek aspirated, voiceless dental plosive (IPA /tʰ/).

The western dialects of the Scythian languages had experienced an evolution of the Proto-Iranic sound /d/ into the Proto-Scythian sound /ð/, which in the Cimmerian and Pontic dialects of Scythian became the sound /l/. Scythian shares the evolution of Proto-Iranic sound /d/ into /ð/ with all Eastern Iranic languages with the exception of Ossetian, Yaghnobi, and Ishkashimi; and the later evolution of /ð/ into /l/ is also present in several Eastern Iranic languages such as Bactrian, Pashto, Munjani, and Yidgha.

== Corpus ==
=== Personal names ===
The primary sources for Scythian words remain the Scythian toponyms, tribal names, and numerous personal names in the ancient Greek texts and in the Greek inscriptions found in the Greek colonies on the Northern Black Sea Coast. These names suggest that the Sarmatian language had close similarities to modern Ossetian.

Recorded Scythian personal names include:

Name	Attested forms	Notes
*Aryapaisah	Ancient Greek: Ἀριαπείθης, romanized: Ariapeíthēs	Composed of: *Aryā, meaning "Aryan" and "Iranic." *paisah, meaning "decoration" and "adornment." Compare with Avestan 𐬞𐬀𐬉𐬯𐬀 (paēsa).
*Hiϑāmϑrauša	Ancient Greek: Ἰδάνθυρσος, romanized: Idánthursos	Meaning "prospering the ally." Composed of: a cognate of Avestan 𐬵𐬌𐬚𐬄𐬨 (hiϑąm), meaning "companion." a cognate of Avestan 𐬚𐬭𐬀𐬊𐬱 (ϑraoš-), meaning "to prosper."
*Hupāyā	Ancient Greek: Ὀποίη, romanized: Opoíē	Composed of: *hu-, "good." *pāyā, "protection"; an abstraction of the root *pā-, "to protect."
*Pālaka	Ancient Greek: Πάλακος, romanized: Pálakos	From an earlier form *Pāδaka after the evolution of Proto-Iranic /d/ to Proto-Scythian /δ/ to Scythian /l/. Means "tall-legged" and "long-legged." Composed of: *pāla-, "foot," from earlier *pāδa-. *-ka, hypocoristic suffix.
*Pr̥tatavah	Akkadian: 𒁹𒁇𒋫𒌅𒀀, romanized: Bartatua or Partatua; Ancient Greek: Προτοθύες, romanized: Protothúes	Means "who is mighty in battle." Composed of: *pr̥tah "battle." Compare with Avestan 𐬞𐬆𐬱𐬀𐬥𐬀 (pəšana) and Vedic Sanskrit पृत् (pṛt-), both meaning "battle." *-tavah "strength, power." Compare with Avestan 𐬙𐬀𐬎𐬎𐬀𐬵 (-tauuah).
*Pr̥ϑutavah	Akkadian: 𒁹𒁇𒋫𒌅𒀀, romanized: Bartatua or Partatua; Ancient Greek: Προτοθύες, romanized: Protothúes	Composed of: *pr̥ϑu- "wide, broad." Compare with Avestan 𐬞𐬆𐬭𐬆𐬚𐬎 (pərᵊϑu-). *-tavah "strength, power." Compare with Avestan 𐬙𐬀𐬎𐬎𐬀𐬵 (-tauuah).
*Skilura	Ancient Greek: Σκίλουρος, romanized: Skílouros	From an earlier form *Skiδura after the evolution of Proto-Iranic /d/ to Proto-Scythian /δ/ to Scythian /l/. Means "sharp" and "victorious."
*Skula	Ancient Greek: Σκύλης, romanized: Skúlēs	From the Scythian endonym *Skula, itself a later dialectal form of *Skuδa resulting from a sound change from /δ/ to /l/.
*Spakayah	Akkadian: 𒁹𒅖𒉺𒅗𒀀𒀀, romanized: Išpakāya	Hypocoristic derivation from the word *spakah, meaning "dog."
*Spargapaisah	Ancient Greek: Σπαργαπείθης, romanized: Spargapeíthēs	Composed of: *spargah "scion" and "descendant." Compare with Avestan 𐬯𐬞𐬀𐬭𐬆𐬖𐬀 (sparᵊγa). *paisah "decoration" and "adornment." Compare with Avestan 𐬞𐬀𐬉𐬯𐬀 (paēsa).
*Tigratavā	Ancient Greek: Τιργαταὼ, romanized: Tirgataṑ	Means "with the strength of an arrow." Composed of: *tigrah "arrow." Compare with Avestan 𐬙𐬌𐬖𐬭𐬌 (tiγri-), "arrow." *-tavah "strength, power." Compare with Avestan 𐬙𐬀𐬎𐬎𐬀𐬵 (-tauuah).
*Uxtamazatā	Ancient Greek: Ὀκταμασάδης, romanized: Oktamasádēs	Means "possessing greatness through his words." Composed of: *uxta-, "word." Compare with Avestan 𐬎𐬑𐬙𐬀 (uxta), "spoken," and 𐬎𐬑𐬜𐬀 (uxδa), "word." *-mazatā-, "great."
*Varika	Ancient Greek: Ὄρικος, romanized: Órikos	Hypocorostic derivation from the word *vari-, meaning "chest armour, armour." Compare with Avestan 𐬬𐬀𐬌𐬭𐬌 (vaⁱri-), 𐬎𐬎𐬀𐬭𐬌 (uuari-) "chest armour."

=== Tribal names ===
Recorded Scythian tribal names include:

Name	Attested forms	Notes
*Haxāϑrauša	Ancient Greek: Ἀγάθυρσοι, romanized: Agáthursoi	Means "prospering the friend/socius." Composed of: a cognate of Old Persian 𐏃𐎧𐎠 (haxā-), meaning "friend." a cognate of Avestan 𐬚𐬭𐬀𐬊𐬱 (ϑraoš-), meaning "to prosper."
*Skuδa	Akkadian: 𒅖𒆪𒍝𒀀𒀀, romanized: Iškuzaya 𒊍𒄖𒍝𒀀𒀀 (Asguzaya) 𒊍𒆪𒍝𒀀𒀀 (Askuzaya) 𒀾𒄖𒍝𒀀𒀀 (Ašguzaya) Ancient Greek: Σκύθαι, romanized: Skúthai	*Skuδa, the Scythian endonym, From the Proto-Indo-European root *skewd-, itself meaning lit. 'shooter, archer', whence also English "shoot".
*Skula	Ancient Greek: Σκόλοτοι, romanized: Skólotoi	Later form of *Skuδa resulting from the evolution of Proto-Scythian /δ/ into Scythian /l/.
*Paralāta	Ancient Greek: Παραλάται, romanized: Paralátai	Cognate with Young Avestan 𐬞𐬀𐬭𐬀𐬜𐬁𐬙𐬀 (Paraδāta), meaning "placed at the front."

=== Place names ===
Some scholars believe that many toponyms and hydronyms of the Russian and Ukrainian steppe have Scythian links. For example, Vasmer associates the name of the river Don with an assumed/reconstructed unattested Scythian word *dānu "water, river", and with Avestan dānu-, Pashto dand and Ossetian don. The river names Don, Donets, Dnieper, Danube, and Dniester, and lake Donuzlav (the deepest one in Crimea) may also belong with the same word-group.

Recorded Scythian place names include:

Name	Attested forms	Notes
*Baurustāna	Ancient Greek: Βορυσθένης, romanized: Borusthénēs	Means "place of beavers." Composed of: *bauru- "beaver." Cognate of: Avestan 𐬠𐬀𐬡𐬭𐬀 (baβra) and 𐬠𐬀𐬡𐬭𐬌 (baβri), meaning "beaver"; Sanskrit बभ्रु (babhrú) and बभ्रुक (bábhruka), meaning "mongoose"; *stāna "space."
*Pantikapa	Ancient Greek: Παντικάπαιον, romanized: Pantikápaion	Means "fish-path." Composed of: *panti-, "path." Compare with Avestan 𐬞𐬀𐬧𐬙𐬃 (paṇtā̊), "path." *kapa-, "fish." Compare with Khotanese Saka kavā, Ossetian Кӕф kæf, and Pashto کب (Kab).
*Rahā	Ancient Greek: Ῥᾶ, romanized: Rhâ	Means "wetness." Compare with Avestan 𐬭𐬀𐬢𐬵𐬁 (raŋhā) and Vedic Sanskrit रसा (rasā́).
*Varu	Ancient Greek: Ὄαρος, romanized: Óaros	Means "broad."

=== Herodotus' Scythian etymologies ===
The Greek historian Herodotus provides another source of Scythian; he reports that the Scythians called the Amazons Oiorpata, and explains the name as a compound of oior, meaning "man", and pata, meaning "to kill" (Hist. 4,110).

- Most scholars associate oior "man" with Avestan vīra- "man, hero", Sanskrit vīra-, Latin vir (gen. virī) "man, hero, husband", PIE *wiHrós. Various explanations account for pata "kill":
  1. Persian pat- "(to) kill", patxuste "killed";
  2. Sogdian pt- "(to) kill", ptgawsty "killed";
  3. Ossetian fædyn "cleave", Sanskrit pātayati "fell", PIE *peth₂- "fall".
  4. Avestan paiti- "lord", Sanskrit páti, PIE *pótis, cf. Lat. potestate (i.e. "man-ruler");
  5. Ossetian maryn "kill", Pashto mrəl, Sanskrit mārayati, PIE *mer- "die" (confusion of Greek Μ and Π);
- Alternatively, one scholar suggests Iranic aiwa- "one" + warah- "breast", the Amazons believed to have removed a breast to aid drawing a bow, according to some ancient folklorists, and as reflected in Greek folk-etymology: a- (privative) + mazos, "without breast".

Elsewhere Herodotus explains the name of the mythical one-eyed tribe Arimaspoi as a compound of the Scythian words arima, meaning "one", and spu, meaning "eye" (Hist. 4,27).

- Some scholars connect arima "one" with Ossetian ærmæst "only", Avestic airime "quiet", Greek erēmos "empty", PIE *h₁(e)rh₁mo-?, and spu "eye" with Avestic spas- "foretell", Sanskrit spaś-, PIE *speḱ- "see".
- However, Iranic usually expresses "one" and "eye" with words like aiwa- and čašman- (Ossetian īw and cæst).
- Other scholars reject Herodotus' etymology and derive the ethnonym Arimaspoi from Iranic aspa- "horse" instead.
- Or the first part of the name may reflect something like Iranic raiwant- "rich", cf. Ossetian riwæ "rich".

=== Scythian theonyms ===
Name	Attested forms	Notes
*Tapatī́	Ancient Greek: Ταβιτί, romanized: Tabití	Means “the Burning One” or “the Flaming One.” Related to: Avestan 𐬙𐬁𐬞𐬀𐬌𐬌𐬈𐬌𐬙𐬌 (tāpaiieⁱti), “to warm.” Sanskrit तापयति (tapayati), “to heat” and “to warm”; theonym तपती (Tapatī); तपस् (tápas) Latin tepeo.
*Api	Ancient Greek: Ἀπί, romanized: Apí and Ἀπία, romanized: Apía	Related to Avestan 𐬀𐬞𐬌 (api), "water."
*Targī̆tavah	Ancient Greek: Ταργιτάος, romanized: Targitáos	Means "possessing the might of the goddess Tarkā." Composed of: *Targiya, "of the goddess Tarkā." *-tavah "strength, power." Compare with Avestan 𐬙𐬀𐬎𐬎𐬀𐬵 (-tauuah).
	Ancient Greek: Ἀρτίμπασα, romanized: Artímpasa	Composed of: Iranic theonym *Arti a term related to *paya, "pasture" and *pati, "lord."
*Apatura	Ancient Greek: Ἀπάτουρος, romanized: Apátouros	Means "swift water." Composed of: *ap-, "water." Related to Avestan 𐬀𐬞 (ap-), "water." *tura-, "quick" or "mighty."
*Gaiϑāsūra	Ancient Greek: Γοιτόσυρος, romanized: Goitósuros	Composed of: *gaiϑā, "herd" and "possessions." Cognate of 𐬔𐬀𐬊𐬌𐬌𐬀𐬊𐬌𐬙𐬌𐬱 (gaoiiaoⁱtiš), "cow pasture." *sūra, "strong" and "mighty."
	Ancient Greek: Θαγιμασάδας, romanized: Thagimasádas and Θαμιμασάδας, romanized: Thamimasádas	Composed of: a possible cognate of Avestan 𐬚𐬡𐬁𐬴𐬀 (ϑβāṣ̌a), "firmament," and Vedic Sanskrit त्वक्ष् (tvakṣ-) or तक्ष् (takṣ-), "to create by putting into motion." mazatā, meaning "great."
*Lipoxšayah	Ancient Greek: Λιπόξαϊς, romanized: Lipóxaïs	From an earlier form *Δipoxšayah after the evolution of Proto-Iranic /d/ to Proto-Scythian /δ/ to Scythian /l/. Means "king of radiance" and "king of heaven." Composed of: *lipah, from earlier *δipah, "to be bright" as well as "sky" and "heaven." *-xšayah, "ruler."
*R̥buxšayah	Ancient Greek: Ἀρπόξαϊς, romanized: Arpóxaïs	Means "king of the airspace." Composed of: *r̥bu-, a cognate of Sanskrit ऋभु (Ṛbhú), the name of a group of deities of the airspace. *-xšayah, "ruler."
*Kolaxšayah	Ancient Greek: Κολάξαϊς, romanized: Koláxaïs Latin: Colaxes	From an earlier form *Kauδaxšayah after the evolution of Proto-Iranic /d/ to Proto-Scythian /δ/ to Scythian /l/. Means "axe-wielding king," where the axe also has the meaning of "sceptre," as well as "blacksmith king," in the sense of "ruling king of the lower world." Composed of: *kolah, from earlier *koδa, "axe." *-xšayah, "ruler."

=== Pliny the Elder ===
Pliny the Elder's Natural History (AD 77–79) derives the name of the Caucasus from the Scythian kroy-khasis = ice-shining, white with snow (cf. Greek cryos = ice-cold).

== Bibliography ==
- Alemany, Agustí (2006). "Onomastica Elamo-Scythica". In del Olmo Lete, Gregorio; Feliu, Lluís; Millet Albà, Adelina (eds.). Sapal tibnim mû illakû: Studies Presented to Joaquín Sanmartín on the Occasion of his 64th Birthday (in Spanish). Barcelona, Spain: Editorial AUSA. pp. 29–34. ISBN 978-8-488-81071-7.
- Bukharin, Mikhail Dmitrievich [in Russian] (2011). "Колаксай и его братья (античная традиция о происхождении царской власти у скифов" [Kolaxais and his Brothers (Classical Tradition on the Origin of the Royal Power of the Scythians)]. Аристей: вестник классической филологии и античной истории (in Russian). 3: 20–80.
- Bukharin, Mikhail [in Russian] (2013). К дискуссии о языке скифов: переход др.ир. *xš- > *s- и его отражение в древнегреческом [Towards the Discussion on the Language of the Scythians: The Transition of OIr *xš- > *s- and its Reflection in the Ancient Greek]. Проблемы Истории, Филологии, Культуры [Problems of History, Philology, Culture]. 40 (2): 263–285.
- Harmatta, J. (1970). "Studies in the History and Language of the Sarmatians". Acta Universitatis de Attila József Nominatae: Acta antiqua et archaeologica. 13. Szeged, Hungary: University of Szeged.
- Harmatta, János (1992). "Languages and Literature in the Kushan Empire" ( (PDF)). In Dani, Ahmad Hasan; Harmatta, János; Puri, Baij Nath; Etemadi, G. F.; Bosworth, Clifford Edmund (eds.). History of Civilizations of Central Asia. Paris, France: UNESCO. pp. 407–431. ISBN 978-9-231-02846-5. Archived from the original on 14 May 2021.
- Harmatta, János (1999). "Herodotus, Historian of the Cimmerians and the Scythians". In Reverdin, Olivier [in French]; Nenci, Giuseppe [in Italian] (eds.). Hérodote et les Peuples Non Grecs [Herodotus and the Non-Greek Peoples] (in French). Vandœuvres, Switzerland: Fondation Hardt pour l’étude de l’Antiquité classique. pp. 115–130. ISBN 978-3-774-92415-4.
- Hinge, George (2005). "Herodot zur skythischen Sprache. Arimaspen, Amazonen und die Entdeckung des Schwarzen Meeres". Glotta (in German). 81: 86–115.
- Hinz, Walther [in German] (1975). Altiranisches Sprachgut der Nebenüberleiferung [Old Iranian Language from Collateral Sources] (in German). Wiesbaden, Germany: Harrassowitz. ISBN 3-447-01703-1.
- Humbach, Helmut; Faiss, Klaus (2012). Herodotus's Scythians and Ptolemy's Central Asia: Semasiological and Onomasiological Studies. Wiesbaden: Dr. Ludwig Reichert Verlag.
- Ivantchik, Askold I. (1999a). "Une légende sur l'origine des Scythes (HDT. IV 5–7) et le problème des sources du Scythicos logos d'Hérodote" [A Legend on the Origin of the Scythians (Hdt. IV 5–7) and the problems of the sources of Herodotus's Scythicos logos]. Revue des Études Grecques [Review of Greek Studies]. 112 (1): 141–92. doi:10.3406/reg.1999.4355. JSTOR 44260011.
- Ivantchik, Askold (1999b). "The Scythian 'Rule Over Asia': the Classical Tradition and the Historical Reality". In Tsetskhladze, G.R. (ed.). Ancient Greeks West and East. Mnemosyne, Supplements, vol. 196. Leiden, Netherlands; Boston, United States: BRILL. pp. 497–520. doi:10.1163/9789004351257_021. ISBN 978-90-04-11190-5.
- Ivantchik, Askold I. (2005). Накануне колонизации. Северное Причерноморье и степные кочевники VIII – VII вв. до н.э. в античной литературной традиции: фольклор, литература и история [On the eve of Colonisation. The Northern Black Sea Region and the Steppe Nomads of the 8th – 7th centuries BC in the Ancient Literary Tradition: Folklore, Literature and History]. Berlin Germany; Moscow, Russia: Eurasien-Abteilung des Deutschen Archäologischen Instituts (Germany); Центр сравнительного изучения древних цивилизаций Института всеобщей истории РАН (Russia); Paleograph Press. ISBN 978-5-895-26015-9.
- Ivantchik, Askold (2018). "Scythians". Encyclopædia Iranica. New York City, United States: Encyclopædia Iranica Foundation; Brill Publishers.
- Kullanda, S. V. [in Russian]; Raevskiy, D. S. [in Russian] (2004). "Эминак в ряду владык Скифии" [Eminakes, King of Scythia] (PDF). Вестник древней истории [Journal of Ancient History] (in Russian). 248 (1): 79–95.
- Kullanda, S. V. [in Russian] (2013). "Скифские этимологии" [Scythian Etymologies]. In Kolganova, G. Y.; Kullanda, S. V. [in Russian]; Nemirovsky, A. A. [in Russian]; Petrova, A. A.; Safronov, A. V. (eds.). Иранский Мир II – I тыс. до н.э. Материалы международной научной конференции, посвященной памяти Эдвина Арвидовича Грантовского и Дмитрия Сергеевича Раевского. Выпуск VI [Iranian World 2nd – 1st millennium BC. Proceedings of the International Scientific conference Dedicated to the Memory of Edwin Arvidovich Grantovsky and Dmitry Sergeevich Raevsky. Issue VI]. Moscow, Russia: Institute of Oriental Studies of the Russian Academy of Sciences. pp. 38–48. ISBN 978-5-892-82576-4.
- Kullanda, Sergei [in Russian] (2014). "External relations of Scythian". Journal of Language Relationship. 11 (1). Piscataway, United States: Gorgias Press: 81–90. doi:10.31826/jlr-2014-110110.
- Lubotsky, Alexander (2002). "Scythian elements in Old Iranian" (PDF). Proceedings of the British Academy. 116. The British Academy; azargoshnasp: 189–202.
- Mayrhofer, M.: Einiges zu den Skythen, ihrer Sprache, ihrem Nachleben. Vienna 2006.
- Melikov, Rauf (2016). "Скифские этнонимы и антропонимы в древневосточных клинописных текстах" [Scythian Ethnonyms and Anthroponyms in Ancient Eastern Cuneiform Texts]. Вопросы эпиграфики [Questions of Epigraphy]. 9: 74–96.
- Novák, Ľubomír (2013). Problem of Archaism and Innovation in the Eastern Iranian Languages. Prague, Czech Republic: Charles University.
- Raevskiy, Dmitriy [in Russian] (1993). Marazov, Ivan (ed.). Scythian Mythology. Sofia, Bulgaria: Secor Publishers. ISBN 978-9-548-25002-3.
- Schmitt, Rüdiger (2003). "Die skythischen Personennamen bei Herodot" [Scythian Personal Names in Herodotus] (PDF). Annali dell'Università degli Studi di Napoli "L'Orientale" [Annals of the University of Naples "L'Orientale"] (in German). 63. Naples, Italy: Università degli Studi di Napoli "L'Orientale": 1–31.
- Schmitt, Rüdiger (2009). Iranisches Personennamenbuch [Book of Iranian Personal Names] (in German). Vol. 7.1a. Verlag der Österreichischen Akademie der Wissenschaften. ISBN 978-3-700-16608-5.
- Schmitt, Rüdiger (2011). Iranisches Personennamenbuch [Book of Iranian Personal Names] (in German). Vol. 5.5a. Verlag der Österreichischen Akademie der Wissenschaften. pp. 341–342. ISBN 978-3-700-17142-3.
- Schmitt, Rüdiger (2018a). "Scythian Language". Encyclopaedia Iranica.
- Schmitt, Rüdiger (2018b). "Massagetae". Encyclopaedia Iranica.
- Schwartz, Martin; Manaster Ramer, Alexis (2019). "Some Interlinguistic Iranian Conundrums". In Hintze, Almut; Durkin, Desmond; Naumann, Claudius (eds.). A Thousand Judgements: Festschrift for Maria Macuch. Harrassowitz Verlag. ISBN 978-3-447-11094-5.
- Szemerényi, Oswald (1980). Four old Iranian ethnic names: Scythian – Skudra – Sogdian – Saka (PDF). Verlag der Österreichischen Akademie der Wissenschaften. ISBN 0-520-06864-5.
- Tokhtasyev, Sergey [in Russian] (2005a). "Проблема Скифского Языка в Современной Науке" [The Problem of the Scythian Language in Contemporary Studies]. In Cojocaru, Victor (ed.). Ethnic Contacts and Cultural Exchanges North and West of the Black Sea from the Greek Colonization to the Ottoman Conquest. Proceedings of the International Symposium Ethnic contacts and Cultural Exchanges North and West of the Black Sea, Iaşi, June 12–17, 2005. Iași, Romania: Trinitas. pp. 59–108. ISBN 978-9-737-83450-8.
- Tokhtasyev, Sergey [in Russian] (2005b). "Sauromatae - Syrmatae - Sarmatae". Херсонесский сборник [Chersonesian Collection] (in Russian). 14: 291–306.
- Tokhtasyev, Sergey [in Russian] (2013). "Из ономастики Северного Причерноморья. XXI. Τράκανα" [On Onomastics of the Northern Black Sea region. XXI. Τράκανα]. Вестник древней истории [Journal of Ancient History]. 281 (1): 193–196.
- Ustinova, Yulia (1999). The Supreme Gods of the Bosporan Kingdom: Celestial Aphrodite and the Most High God. Religions in the Graeco-Roman World, vol. 135. Leiden, Netherlands; Boston, United States: Brill. doi:10.1163/9789004295902. ISBN 978-9-004-11231-5.
- Witczak, K. T. [in Polish] (1999). "Скифский язык: опыт описания" [The Scythian Language: Attempt at Description]. Вопросы языкознания. 5: 50–59.
- Zgusta, L.: Die griechischen Personennamen griechischer Städte der nördlichen Schwarzmeerküste. Die ethnischen Verhältnisse, namentlich das Verhältnis der Skythen und Sarmaten, im Lichte der Namenforschung, Prague 1955.
