= Agathyrsi =

Ancient people of the Transylvanian Plateau

Haxāϑrauš
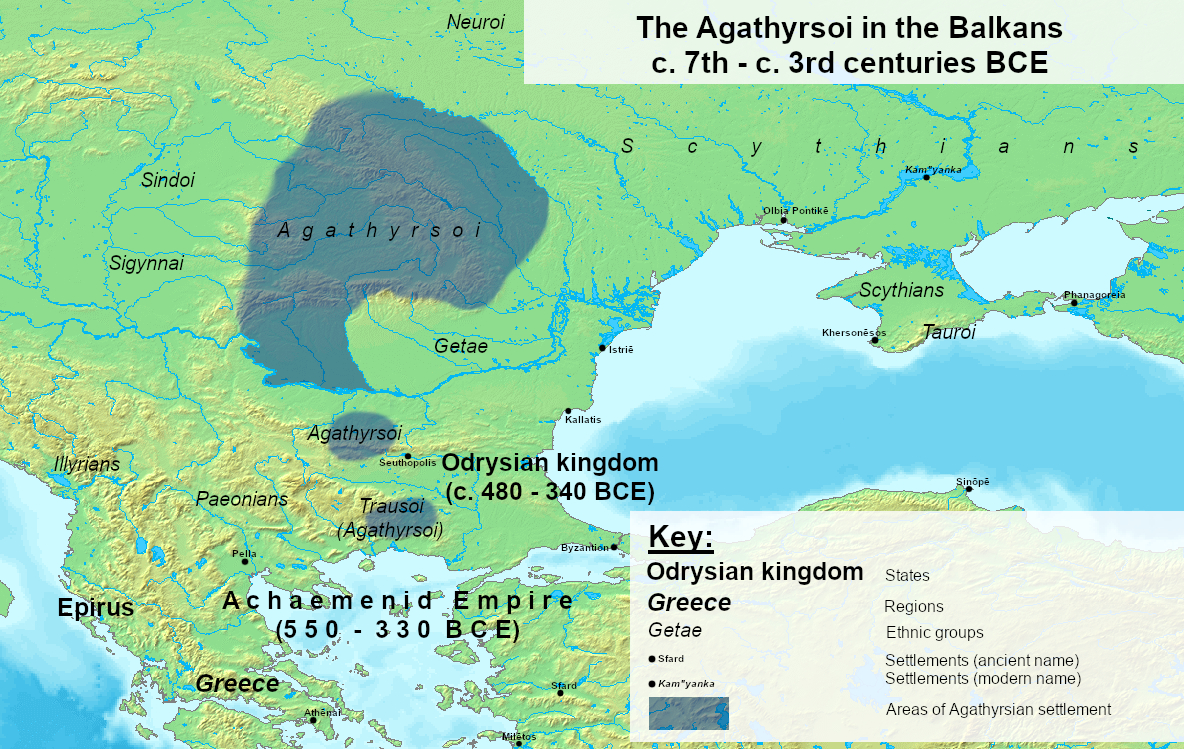
- The Agathyrsi lived in Transylvania when they first appeared in historical records

Regions with significant populations
- Pontic Steppe (9th–8th century BC); Moldavia, Transylvania, Oltenia (7th–3rd century BC)

Languages
- Scythian; Getic

Religion
- Scythian religion Thracian religion

Related ethnic groups
- Cimmerians, Dacians, Getae, Massagetae, Saka, Sarmatians, Scythians, Thracians

The Agathyrsi were an ancient people belonging to the Scythian cultures who lived in Pryazovia before being later displaced by the Scythians into the Transylvanian Plateau, in the region that later became Dacia. The Agathyrsi are largely known from Herodotus of Halicarnassus's description of them in the 5th century BC.

== Name ==
The name Agathyrsi is the Latinisation of the Ancient Greek name Agathursoi (Ἀγάθυρσοι), which was itself the Hellenized form of a Scythian name whose original form is not attested.

The linguist Alexis Manaster Ramer has reconstructed the original Scythian form of this name as *Haxāϑrauš, meaning "prospering the friend/socius", with the final part modified into -θύρσος, referring to the composite vegetal wand of Bacchus, in Greek because the ancient Greeks associated Scythian peoples with Bacchic rites.

== History ==
=== Origin ===
The formation of genuine nomadic pastoralism happened in the early 1st millennium BC due to climatic changes causing the environment in the Central Asian and Siberian steppes to become cooler and drier than before. These changes caused the sedentary mixed farmers of the Bronze Age to become nomadic pastoralists, so that by the 9th century BC all the steppe settlements of the sedentary Bronze Age populations had disappeared, leading to the development of population mobility and the formation of warrior units necessary to protect herds and take over new areas. These climatic conditions in turn caused the nomadic groups to become transhumant pastoralists constantly moving their herds from one pasture to another in the steppe, and to search for better pastures to the west, in Ciscaucasia and the forest steppe regions of western Eurasia.

The arrival of the Agathyrsi in Europe was part of the larger process of westward movement of Central Asian Iranic nomads towards Southeast and Central Europe which lasted from the 1st millennium BC to the 1st millennium AD, and later included other Iranic nomads such as the Cimmerians, Scythians, Sauromatians, and Sarmatians. The archaeological and historical records regarding these migrations are however scarce, and permit only a very broad outline of this complex development to be sketched.

The Agathyrsi originated as a section of the first wave of the nomadic populations who originated in the parts of Central Asia corresponding to eastern Kazakhstan or the Altai-Sayan region, and who had, beginning in the 10th century BC and lasting until the 9th to 8th centuries BC, migrated westwards into the Pontic-Caspian Steppe regions, where they formed new tribal confederations which constituted the Chernogorovka-Novocherkassk complex.

Among these tribal confederations were the Agathyrsi in the Pontic Steppe, as well as the Cimmerians in the Caspian Steppe, and possibly the Sigynnae in the Pannonian Steppe. The archaeological and historical records regarding these migrations are however scarce, and permit to sketch only a very broad outline of this complex development.

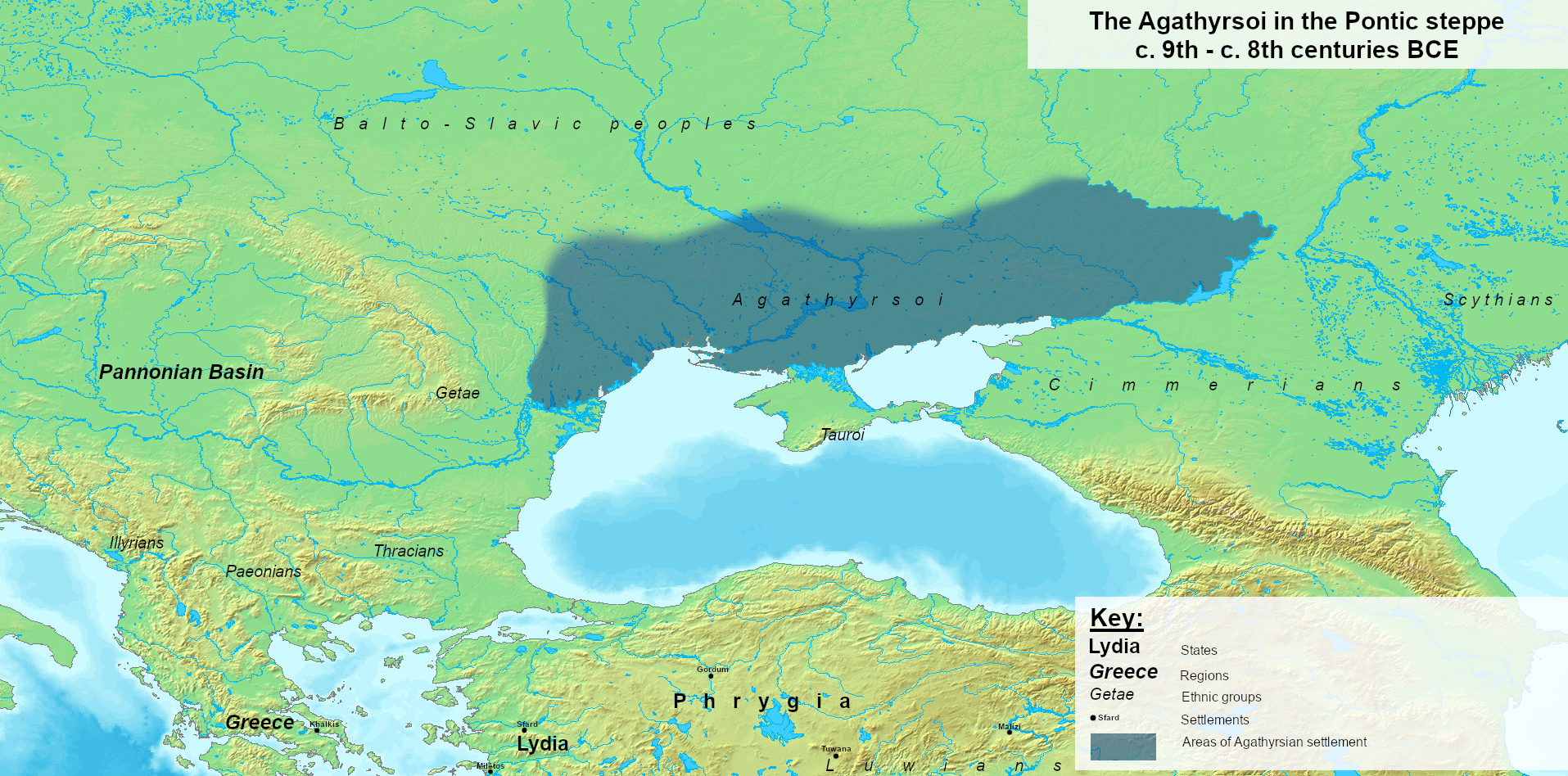
The Agathyrsi initially inhabited the Pontic steppe.

The Agathyrsi thus corresponded to a part of the Chernogorovka-Novocherkassk complex, to whose development three main cultural influences contributed to:

- present in the development of the Chernogorovka-Novocherkassk complex is a strong impact of the native Bilozerka culture, especially in the form of pottery styles and burial traditions;
- the two other influences were of foreign origin:
  - attesting of the Inner Asian origin, a strong material influence from the Altai, Aržan and Karasuk cultures from Central Asia and Siberia is visible in the Chernogorovka-Novocherkassk complex of Inner Asian origin were especially dagger and arrowhead types, horse gear such as bits with stirrup-shaped terminals, deer stone-like carved stelae and Animal Style art;
  - in addition to this Central Asian influence, the Kuban culture of Ciscaucasia also played an important contribution in the development of the Chernogorovka-Novocherkassk complex, especially regarding the adoption of Kuban culture-types of mace heads and bimetallic daggers.

The Chernogorovka-Novocherkassk complex thus developed natively in the North Pontic region over the course of the 9th to mid-7th centuries BC from elements which had earlier arrived from Central Asia, due to which it itself exhibited similarities with the other early nomadic cultures of the Eurasian steppe and forest steppe which existed before the 7th century BC, such as the Aržan culture, so that these various pre-Scythian early nomadic cultures were thus part of a unified Aržan-Chernogorovka cultural layer originating from Central Asia.

Thanks to their development of highly mobile mounted nomadic pastoralism and the creation of effective weapons suited to equestrian warfare, all based on equestrianism, these nomads from the Pontic-Caspian Steppes were able to gradually infiltrate into Central and Southeast Europe and therefore expand deep into this region over a very long period of time, so that the Chernogorovka-Novocherkassk complex covered a wide territory ranging from Central Europe and the Pannonian Plain in the west to Caucasia in the east, including present-day Southern Russia.

This in turn allowed the Chernogorovka-Novocherkassk complex itself to strongly influence the Hallstatt culture of Central Europe: among these influences was the adoption of trousers, which were not used by the native populations of Central Europe before the arrival of the Central Asian steppe nomads.

Within the western sections of the Eurasian Steppe, the Agathyrsi lived in the part of the Pontic Steppe situated on the northern shore of the Maeotian Sea corresponding to Pryazovia, while their neighbours to the east, in the Ciscaucasian Steppe and the steppe regions to the north of the Caspian Sea were the Cimmerians, who themselves also belonged to the grouping of Iranic nomads of Central Asian origin belonging to the Chernogorovka-Novocherkassk complex.

=== Displacement of the Agathyrsi ===
A second wave of migration of Iranic nomads corresponded arrival of the early Scythians from Central Asia into the Caucasian Steppe, which started in the 9th century BC, when a significant movement of the nomadic peoples of the Eurasian Steppe started after the early Scythians were expelled out of Central Asia by either the Massagetae, who were a powerful nomadic Iranic tribe from Central Asia closely related to the Scythians, or by another Central Asian people called the Issedones, thus forcing the early Scythians to the west, across the Araxes river and into the Caspian and Ciscaucasian Steppes.

This western migration of the early Scythians lasted through the middle 8th century BC, and archaeologically corresponded to the movement of a population originating from Tuva in southern Siberia in the late 9th century BC towards the west, and arriving in the 8th to 7th centuries BC into Europe, especially into Ciscaucasia, which it reached some time between c. 750 and c. 700 BC, thus following the same migration general path as the first wave of Central Asian Iranic nomads who had formed the Chernogorovka-Novocherkassk complex.

The westward migration of the Scythians brought them to the lands of the Cimmerians, after which the Scythians settled between the Araxes river to the east, the Caucasus mountains to the south, and the Maeotian Sea to the west, in the Ciscaucasian Steppe where were located the Scythian kingdom's headquarters.

The arrival of the Scythians corresponded to a disturbance of the development of the Cimmerian peoples' Chernogorovka-Novocherkassk complex, which was thus replaced over the course of c. 750 to c. 600 BC by the early Scythian culture in southern Europe, which itself nevertheless still showed links to the Chernogorovka-Novocherkassk complex.

From their base in the Ciscaucasian Steppe, the Scythians over the course of the 8th to 7th centuries BC conquered the Pontic and Crimean Steppes to the north of the Black Sea up to the Istros river, whose mouth henceforth formed the western boundary of Scythian territory.

The conquest of their territories by the Scythians from the east pushed the Agathyrsi westwards, out of the Pontic Steppe, with the Scythians themselves replacing them as the main population of the Pontic Steppe, thus completing the process of the Scythians becoming the main dominant population of the Pontic-Steppe over the course of c. 650 to c. 600 BC. The Agathyrsi henceforth became the immediate neighbours of the Scythians to their west and the relations between these two tribes remained hostile.

=== In the Balkans ===
After their displacement, the Agathyrsi settled in the regions surrounding the Eastern Carpathian Mountains corresponding to the territories presently called Moldavia, Oltenia and Transylvania, although they also may have been one of the peoples who had free access to the Wallachian and Moldavian Plains along with the Scythians.

In these regions, the Agathyrsi established themselves as a ruling class over the indigenous population, who were Geto-Thracians, and intermarried with these local peoples and gradually assimilated into these local peoples' culture. And, beginning in the 6th century BC, the Agathyrsi were organising into fortified settlements, such as the ones at Stâncești and Cotnari, which acted as important centres of the Getae.

A section of the displaced Agathyrsi might also have migrated more southwards into Thrace proper, where a group of this people was located on the Haemus Mons by Stephanus of Byzantium.

==== The Trausi ====
Stephanus of Byzantium also suggested that a section of the Agathyrsi were present on the Rhodope Mountains by his mention that the Greeks referred to the Trausi (Ancient Greek: Τραυσοί, romanized: Trausoí; Latin: Trausi, Thrausi) tribe who lived there as being Agathyrsi.

On the Rhodopes, the Trausi initially lived to the north-east of the Thracian tribe of the Bistones. By the early 2nd century BC, the Trausi had migrated to the east of the Hebrus river in the hinterland of Maroneia and Aenus, and they soon disappeared from history after being conquered by the kingdom of the Sapaei.

=== Scythian influence ===
In the 6th century BC, some splinter Scythian groups followed the earlier route of the nomads of the Chernogorovka-Novocherkassk wave, passed through the passes of the Carpathian Mountains, and settled in the Pannonian Basin, where some of them settled in the territory of the Agathyrsi while others moved into the Pannonian Steppe and settled in the territory of the Sigynnae, and subsequently intermarried with the local populations while remaining in contact with the Pontic Steppe through trade.

These migrations and trade connections contributed to the transformation of the culture of the Agathyrsi and the Sigynnae into a more Scythian-like form.

==== Persian invasion of Scythia ====
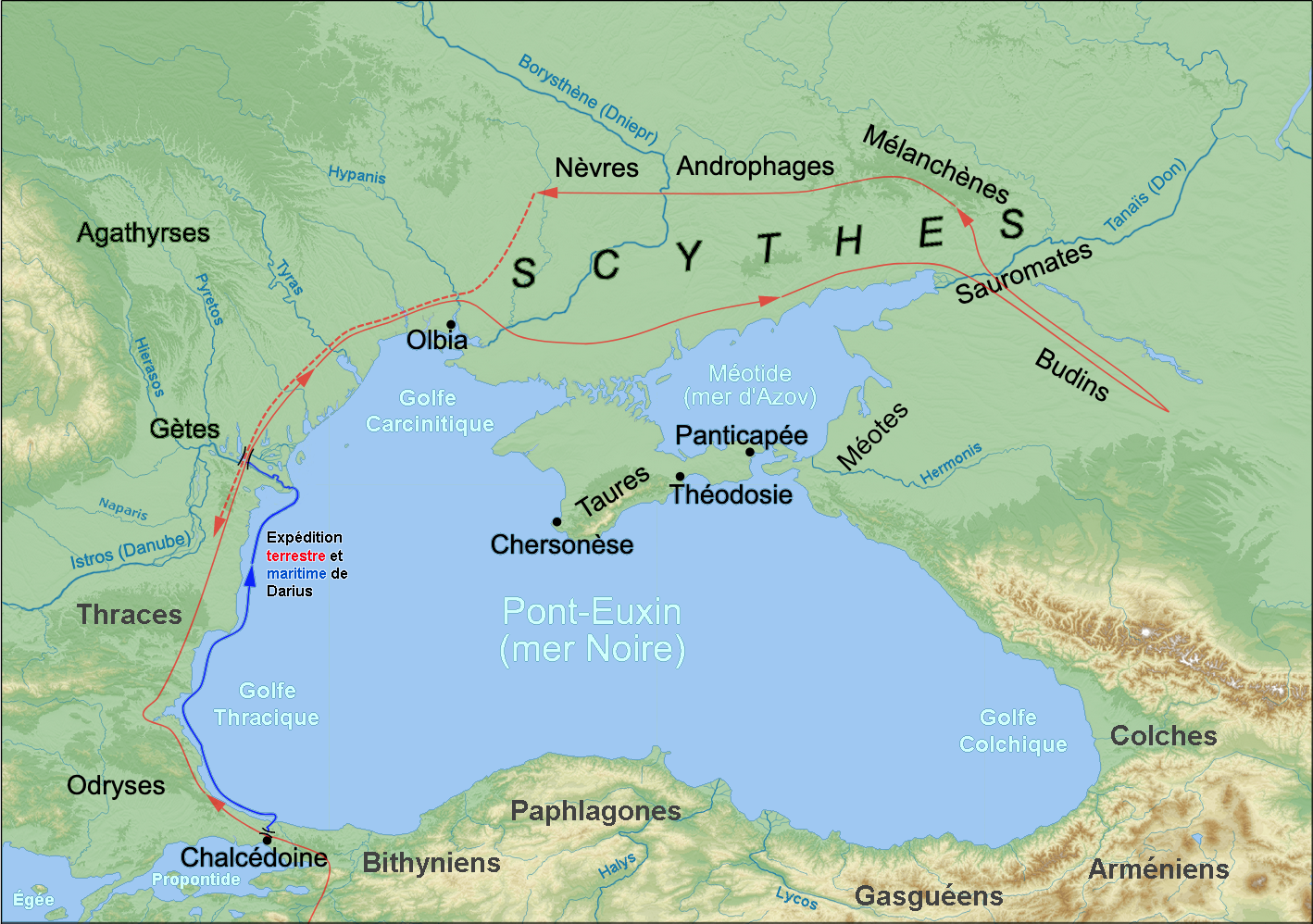
Map of the Scythian campaign of Darius I.

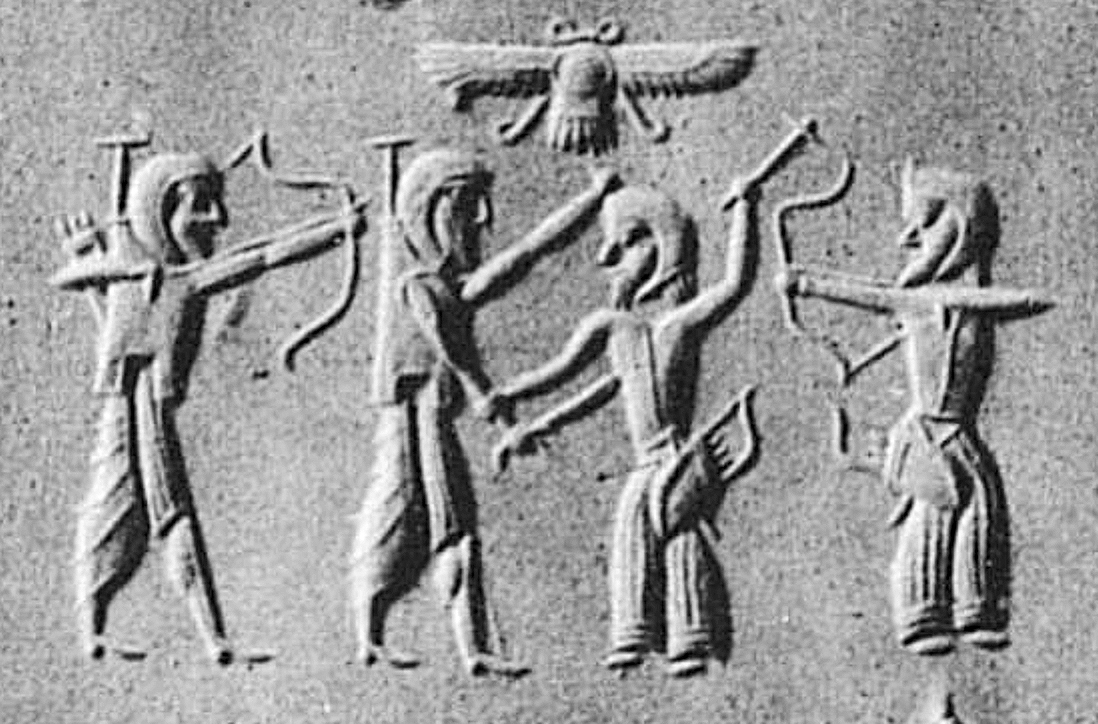
Persian soldiers (left) fighting against Scythians. Cylinder seal impression.

In the late 6th century BC, the Achaemenid Persian Empire started expanding into Europe, beginning with the Persian annexation of all of Thrace, after which the Achaemenid king of kings Darius I crossed the Istros river in 513 BC and attacked the Scythian kingdom with an army of 700,000 to 800,000 soldiers, possibly with the goal of annexing it.

In response, the Scythian king Idanthyrsus summoned the kings of the peoples surrounding his kingdom to a council to decide how to deal with the Persian invasion. The Budini, Geloni and Sauromatians joined the Scythian-led alliance in resisting the Persian invasion, and Idanthyrsus led the joint forces of the Scythians and their allied neighbours in resisting the Persian invasion. Meanwhile, the Agathyrsi, Androphagi, Melanchlaeni, Neuri and Tauri refused to support the Scythians.

According to the Greek author Herodotus of Halicarnassus, during the campaign the fleeing Scythians and the Persian army pursuing them passed through the territories of the Melanchlaeni, Androphagi, and Neuri, before they reached the borders of the Agathyrsi, who refused to let the Scythian divisions to pass into their territories and find refuge there, thus forcing the Scythians to return to Scythia with the Persians pursuing them.

=== Death of Ariapeithes ===
At some point between c. 475 and c. 460 BC, the Scythian king Ariapeithes was killed by the Agathyrsian king Spargapeithes.

=== Celtic immigration ===
In the middle of the 5th century BC, the Hallstatt culture developed into the La Tène culture, whose people are identified with the Celts, who by the late 5th century BC were moving to the east along the upper Istros and initially settled in Transistria before moving into the Pannonian Steppe where lived the Sigynnae and later into the mountainous regions where lived the Agathyrsi. The relations between the Celtic incomers and the Iranic nomads appear to have remained peaceful, with the Celts later intermarrying with the local populations of the Pannonian Basin, thus exposing the Celts to the influence of the beliefs, practices and art styles of the steppe nomads so that motifs borrowed from and influenced by the steppe nomads started appearing in La Tène Celtic art.

Among these borrowed artistic influences were images of predatory carnivores, sometimes attacking herbivorous beasts, as well as motifs of pairs of animals facing each other, giving rise to Celtic motif of the "dragon pairs" which decorated the tops of Celtic sword scabbards. Another motif borrowed by Celtic art from steppe art are pairs of predatory birds around shield circular bosses, reflecting not only the mere artistic influence of the steppe nomads, but also of the borrowing by the Celts of Iranic steppe nomad belief systems expressed through the image of predatory beasts.

==== Ethnogenesis of the Dacians ====
The Agathyrsi were barely mentioned again in outside sources after Herodotus of Halicarnassus described them in the 5th century BC, and it is unknown for how long they were able to maintain their Agathyrsian identity. However, the Graeco-Roman author Claudius Ptolemy and an inscription from Rome, both from the middle of the 1st century AD, mentioned the Agathyrsi.

The Agathyrsi appear to have eventually become fully assimilated into the Geto-Thracian populations among whom they lived, and the Getic groups organised around the Agathyrsian fortified settlements eventually evolved into the Dacian culture, with a large part of the later Dacian people being consequently descended from the Agathyrsi. The Agathyrsi hence disappeared from history in a process typical of most Scythic peoples who back then formed the substrate of the many powerful tribal federations of the Ponto-Danubian region.

=== Legacy ===
The peoples of the Chernogorovka-Novocherkassk complex of which the Agathyrsi were part of introduced the use of trousers into Central Europe, whose local native populations did not wear trousers before the arrival of the first wave of steppe nomads of Central Asian origin into Europe.

The role of the Agathyrsi as the oldest Scythic population of the Pontic Steppe was reflected in the Scythian genealogical myth of the Scythians proper, according to which Agathyrsus was the eldest of the three ancestors of the Scythian peoples born of the union of the god Targitaos and the Snake-Legged Goddess.

The displacement of the Agathyrsi by the Scythians is expressed in the genealogical myth by how the Snake-Legged Goddess banished her two eldest sons, Agathyrsus and Gelonus, from her country and instead crowned as king her youngest son, Scythes, who was the ancestor of the Scythians proper.

==== Modern ====
Early modern scholars attempted to link the Agathyrsi to the Hunnish tribe of the Akatziri due to the similarity of the two peoples' names. However, the historian E. A. Thompson dismissed this identification as a conjecture to be rejected.

== Culture and society ==
=== Location ===
==== In the Pontic Steppe ====
From the 9th to the late 8th or early 7th centuries BC, the Agathyrsi occupied the eastern sections of the Pontic Steppe on the northern shores of the Maeotian Sea.

The neighbours of the Agathyrsi to the east, in the Ciscaucasian Steppe and the steppe regions to the north of the Caspian Sea were the Cimmerians, who themselves also belonged to the grouping of Iranic nomads of Central Asian origin belonging to the Chernogorovka-Novocherkassk complex and were therefore closely related to the Agathyrsi.

==== In the Balkans ====
At the time when the Greek historian Herodotus of Halicarnassus described them, in the 5th century BC, the Agathyrsi were living in the region which later became known as Dacia and is presently known as Transylvania, as well as in the region of the Carpathian Mountains and to their east and north of the Danube river where was located the source of the Maris river, that is in the regions corresponding to present-day Moldavia and Oltenia, and they may have been one of the peoples who had free access to the Wallachian and Moldavian Plains along with the Scythians.

The eastern neighbours of the Agathyrsi were the Pontic Scythians, while their northern neighbours were the Neuri, who were a Baltic population.

=== Ethnicity ===
By the time the Agathyrsi were living in the Balkans, they had become a people of mixed Scytho-Thracian origin, composed of a Geto-Thracian population with an Iranic-Scythic ruling class, as attested by how their kings, such as Agathyrsus and Spargapeithes, were Iranic.

The assimilation of the Scythic Agathyrsi into the Getic population of the areas they had settled in is attested by how their culture combined Iranic and Thracian elements.

=== Social organisation ===
Unlike the nomads of the Pontic Steppe, the Pannonian Basin nomads such as the Agathyrsi appear to not have possessed an elite class.

=== Language ===
Reflecting their Scythic origin, the names of the kings of Agathyrsi, such as Agathyrsus and Spargapeithes, were Iranic.

=== Gender roles ===
Herodotus of Halicarnassus claimed that the men of the Agathyrsi had their wives in common so that all of their people would be each other's siblings and members of a single family living together without jealousy or hatred.

=== Lifestyle ===
==== Dress ====
The clothing of the Agathyrsi likely included the use of trousers, which was a typical part of steppe nomads' dress.

The Agathyrsi lived in luxury and wore gold jewellery.

==== Hair dyeing ====
The aristocracy of the Agathyrsi dyed their hair dark blue to distinguish themselves from the common people.

==== Tattooing ====
The Agathyrsi had followed Thracian customs such as tattooing, which the aristocracy of the Agathyrsi performed to distinguish themselves from the common people: the tattoos of the Agathyrsi consisted of checkered designs in blue-black ink on their faces and limbs, and their intensity, intricacy and vibrancy was proportional to their bearers' social status and the prestige of their lineage.

Tattooing was especially practised among Agathyrsi women.

==== Religion ====
According to Herodotus of Halicarnassus, the Trausi, who lived in southern Thrace, practised a custom which was unique among the peoples of all of Thrace: the relatives of newborns would sit around them and mourn all the misfortunes they would have to go through in life, and would celebrate with joy during funerals since they believed that death had instead brought happiness to the deceased by freeing them from the miseries of life.

==== Other customs ====
The Agathyrsi traditionally memorised their laws in song form.

== Archaeology ==
To the early phase of the Agathyrsian presence in Transylvania belongs a cemetery from the 8th to 7th centuries BC at Stoicani.

In the 6th century BC, the populations of the Chernogorovka-Novocherkassk complex of Central Europe came under Scythian influence, resulting in them becoming more Scythianised: the Agathyrsi thus corresponded to a local group of the Scythian culture located in Transylvania, around the valley of the Mures river, with scattered groups being present in areas of Romania and Bessarabia.

The archaeological remains of the Agathyrsi exhibited a unique character due to the absorption of Thracian elements by Iranic incomers, and consist of multiple hundred burials in the form of both cremations and inhumations: the inhumations were themselves buried in simple Scythian-type catacomb tombs, and the grave goods included Scythian-type weapon sets and jewellery from the 6th and 5th centuries BC. The pottery of the Agathyrsi was derived from traditions native to the Transylvanian region.

A related culture from the region of future Wallachia on the lower Danube was the Ferigile culture, to which belonged Scythian-type weapons, horse harnesses and pottery.

The Agathyrsi themselves corresponded to the archaeological culture which had created the fortified settlements of the Stincesti-Cotnari type in the 6th century BC. Objects found isolated or in graves in territories identifiable with the Agathyrsi are characteristic of the Scythian culture, and consist of:

- military gear such as:
  - arrows,
  - quivers,
  - akīnakai,
  - iron battle-axes,
  - scale armour,
  - shields;
- horse gear,
- personal accessories such as:
  - bronze mirrors,
  - pole-top rattles,
  - bronze kettles,
  - gold ornaments,
  - and dress attachments.

=== Gallery ===
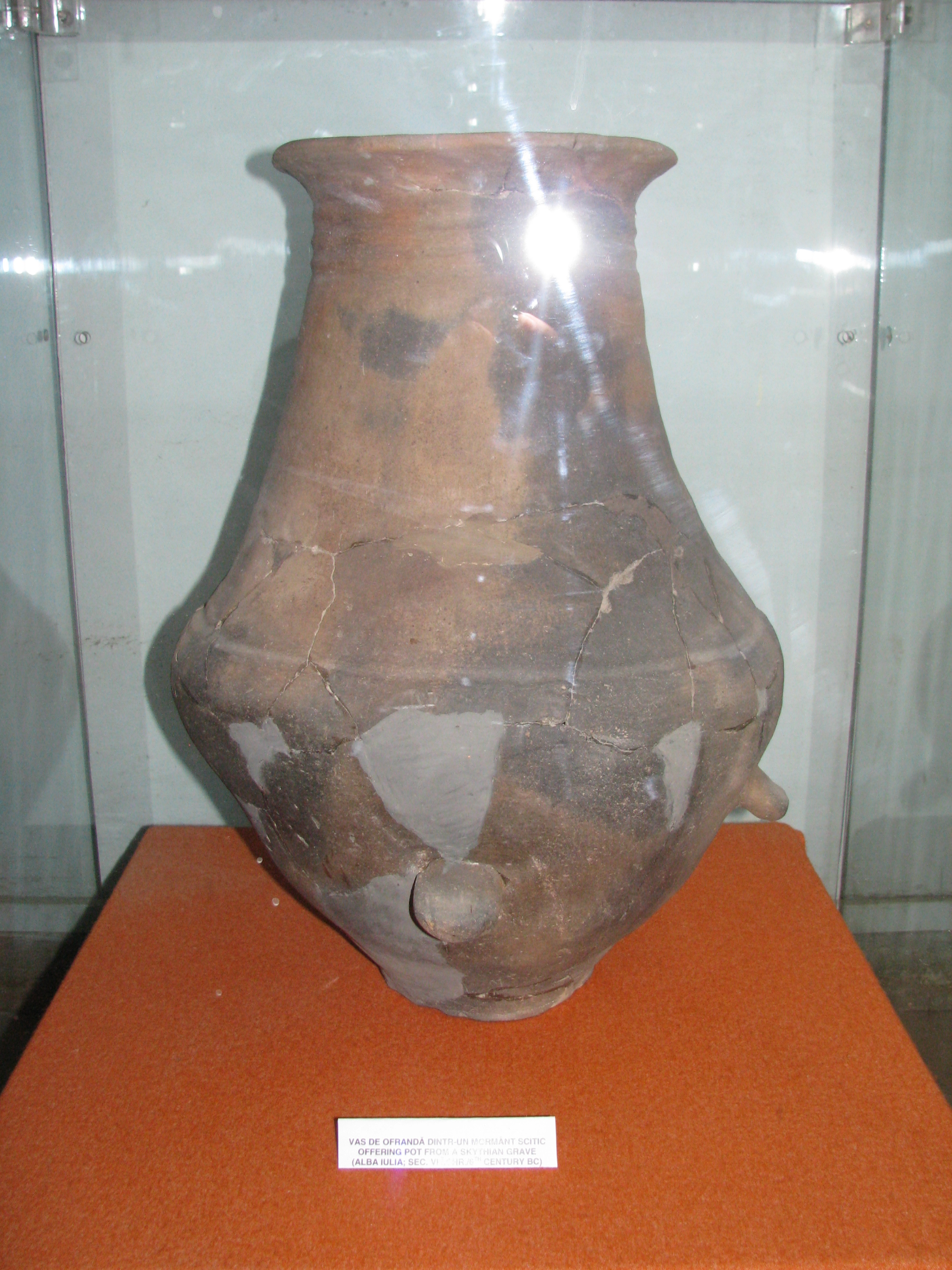
Offering pot from a Scythian grave from Alba Iulia, Romania, 6th century BC. In display at National Museum of the Union, Alba Iulia.

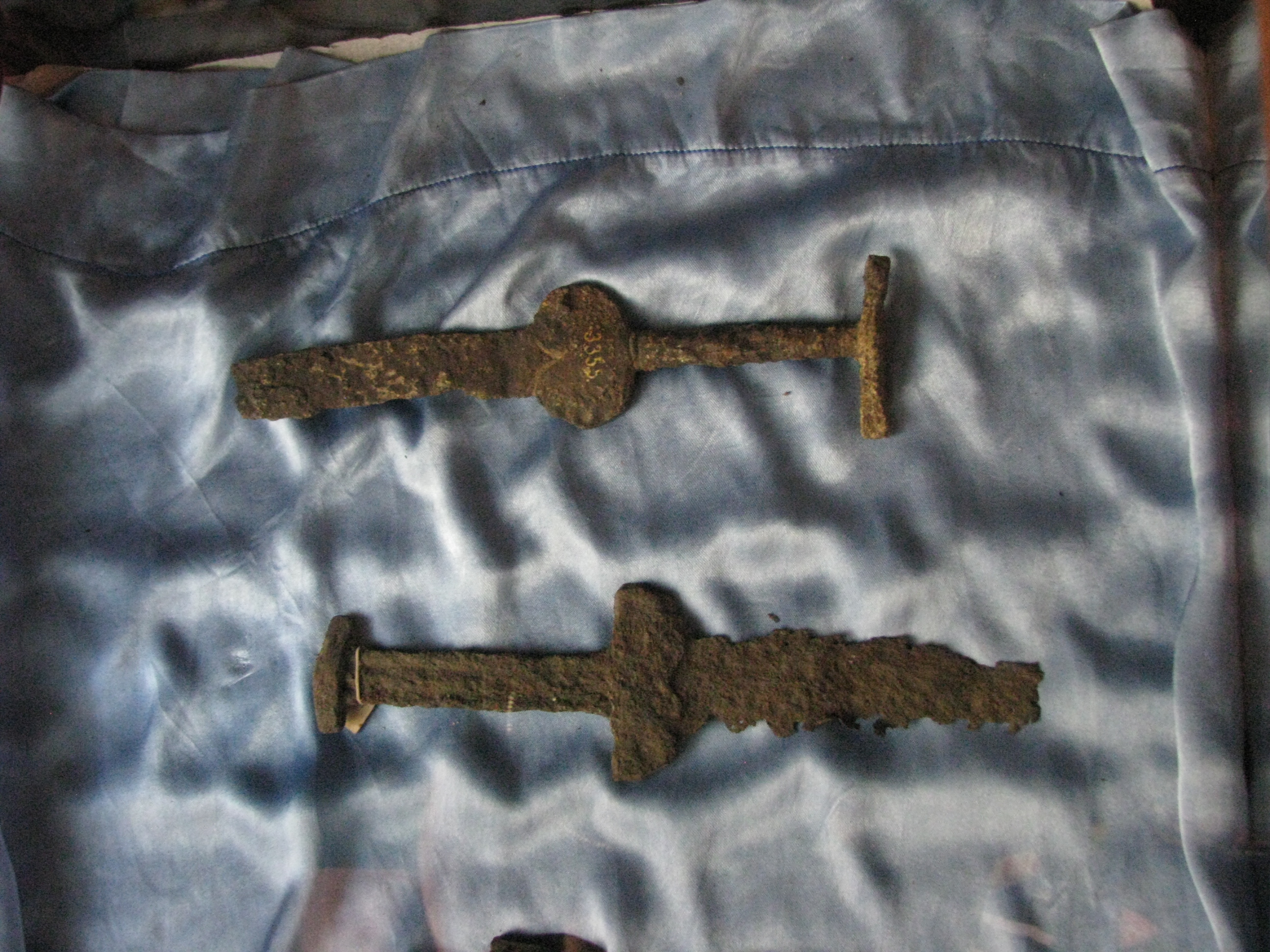
Scythian artefacts originating from sites in Transylvania, in display at Aiud History Museum, Aiud, Romania.

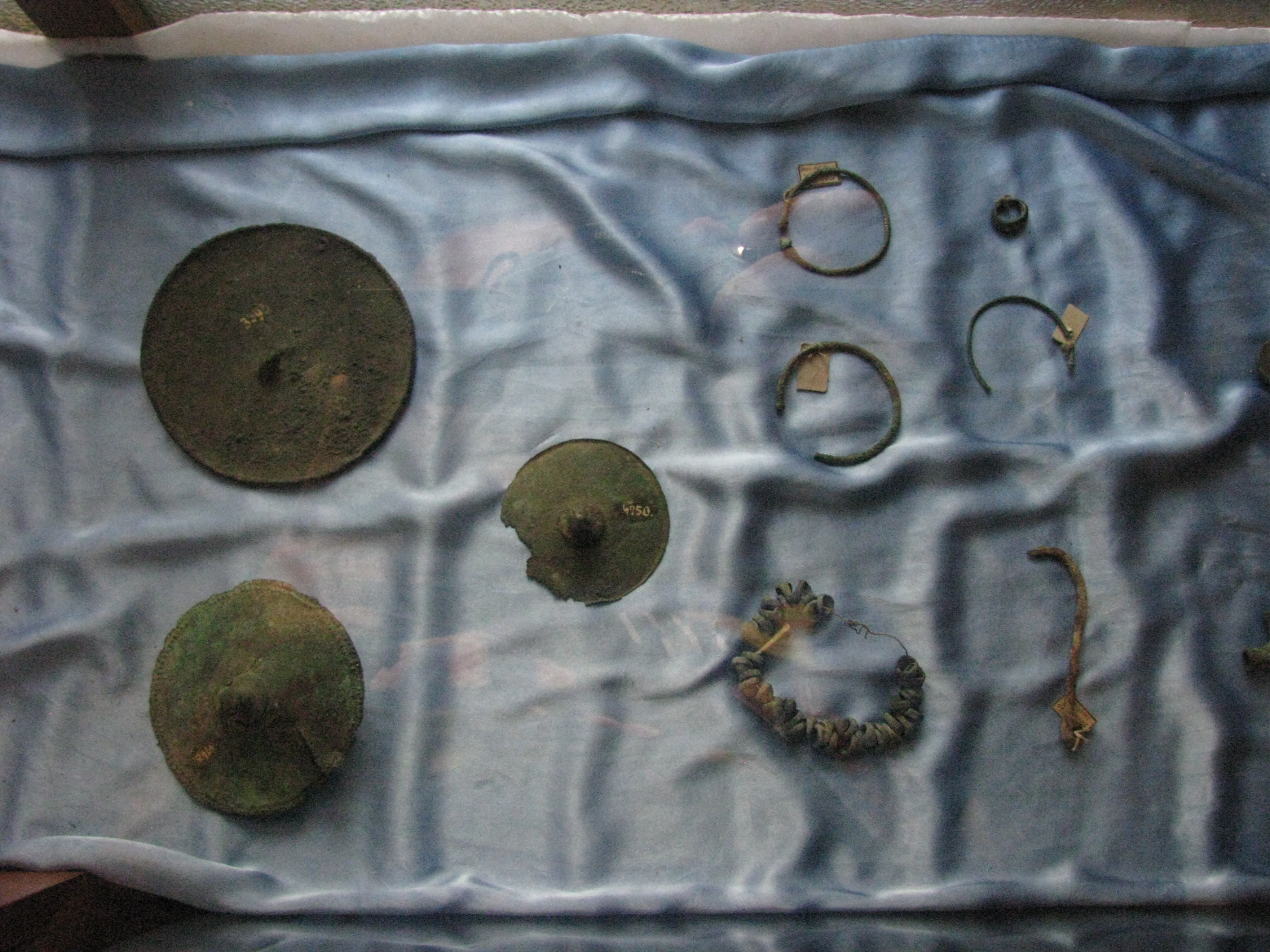
Scythian artefacts originating from sites in Transylvania, in display at Aiud History Museum, Aiud, Romania.

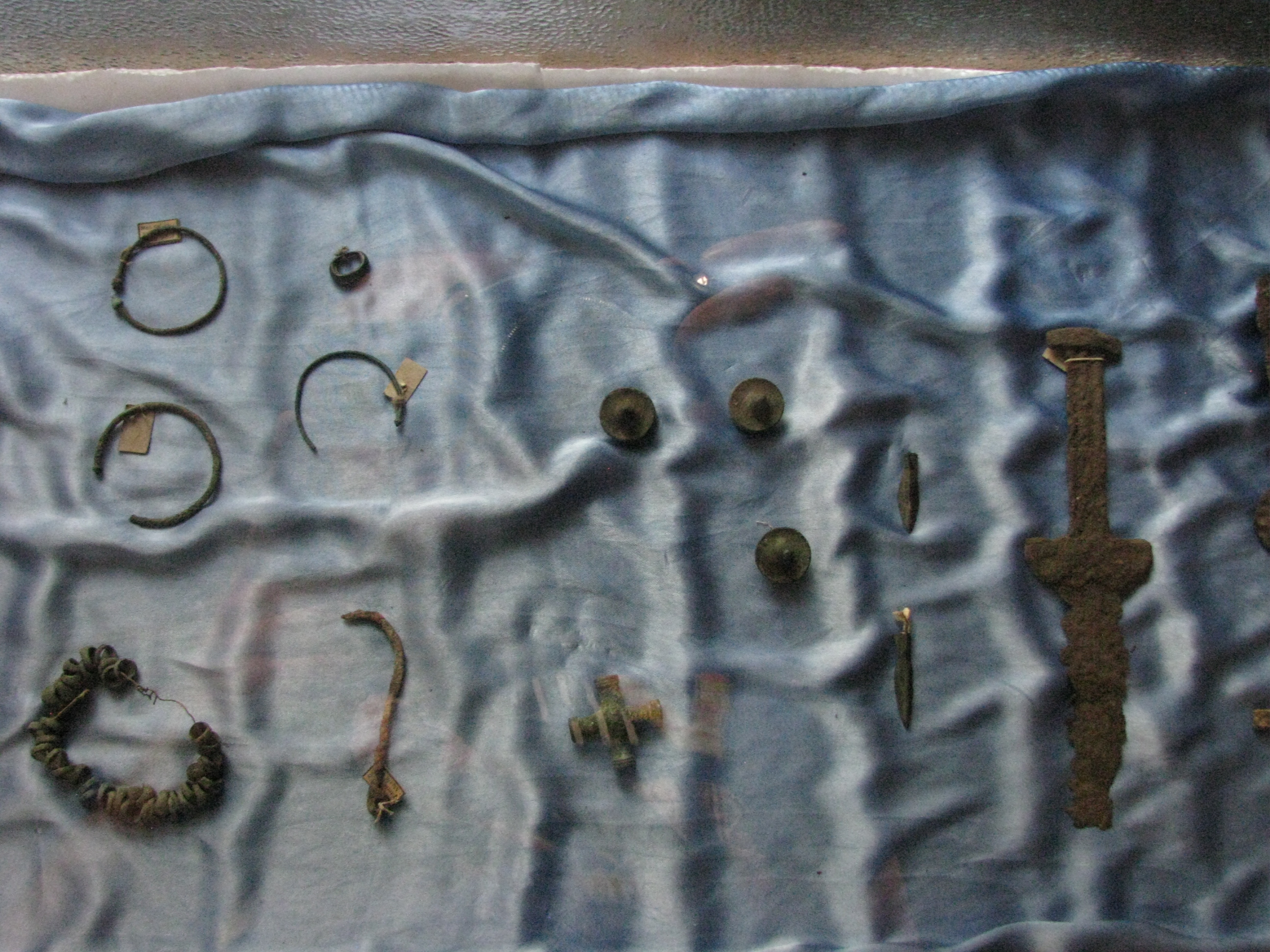
Scythian artefacts originating from sites in Transylvania, in display at Aiud History Museum, Aiud, Romania.

== See also ==
- Cimmerians
- Dacians
- Getae
- Scythians
- Sigynnae
