= Octamasadas =

5th-century BC Scythian king

Octamasadas (Scythian *Uxtamazatā; Ancient Greek: Ὀκταμασάδης, romanized: Oktamasadēs; Latin: Octamasades) was a Scythian king, the son of King Ariapeithes, who lived around 446 BC. He came to power after he deposed and replaced his half-brother Scyles. Octamasadas was the son of Teres I’s daughter, making Octamasadas Teres’ grandson. Teres I was the father of Sitalces (431–424 BC) and Sparadocus (448–440 BC), Thracian kings.

== Name ==
The name (Ancient Greek: Ὀκταμασάδης, romanized: Oktamasadēs) is the Hellenisation of the Scythian language name *Uxtamazatā, meaning "possessing greatness through his words."

== Rise to power ==
Octamasadas became king after the Scythians broke out into revolt. The Scythians revolted because then-king Scyles, Octamasadas' half-brother, admired Grecian culture and did not behave in a traditional Scythian fashion. When Scyles heard of this revolt, he fled to Thrace. After hearing that his brother had fled to Thrace, Octamasadas gathered his army and headed for Thrace. When Octamasadas arrived at the river Ister, the Thracian army was waiting for him. The two sides were about to engage in battle when Sitalces sent a message to Octamasadas by a herald. Sitalces proposed a trade; Sitalces would surrender Scyles if Octamasadas handed over one of Sitalces' brothers, who had taken refuge with the Scythians because he feared Sitalces. Octamasadas/Uxtamazatā accepted the terms and surrendered his own uncle to Sitalces.

After the exchange, Sitalces left with his brother, while Octamasadas beheaded Scyles as soon as he received him. This rapprochement between the Scythians and the Thracians – though tragic for Scyles - led to the stabilization among these players as regional powers along with the Thracian Spartocids, which resulted to a period of economic prosperity.
