= Alanic language =

Ancient Iranian language of the Caucasus

Alanic
- Alanian, Old Ossetic, Old Ossetian
- The Zelenchuk Inscription, an inscription in Alanic.
- Native to: Alania, the Kingdom of the Alans in Hispania and the Kingdom of the Vandals and Alans
- Region: North Caucasus, Pontic–Caspian steppe, Balkan peninsula, parts of Late Roman Gaul, Iberia and the Maghreb
- Ethnicity: Alans, Asud
- Era: 1st–13th century AD developed into Ossetian and Jassic
- Language family: Indo-European: Indo-Iranian; Iranian; Northeastern; Scythian; Western; Alanic
- Dialects: (Western) Alanic
- Writing system: unwritten, rarely Greek

Language codes
- ISO 639-3: Either: xln – Alanic oos – Old Ossetic
- Glottolog: oldo1234 Old Ossetic

Alanic (also known as Alanian, Old Ossetic and Old Ossetian) is an extinct Iranian language spoken by the Alans from about the 1st to the 13th centuries AD, a dialect directly descended from the earlier Scytho-Sarmatian languages, which would in turn give rise to the Ossetian language. Byzantine Greek authors recorded only a few fragments of this language. The Alans who moved westward in the Migration Period brought their language to Iberia and to the Maghreb in 409 AD, before being displaced by the invading Visigoths and by the Byzantine Empire.

Unlike Pontic Scythian, Ossetian did not experience the evolution of the Proto-Scythian sound /d/ to /ð/ and then /l/, although the sound /d/ did evolve into /ð/ at the beginning of Ossetian words.

According to Magomet Isayev, the Zelenchuk inscription and other historical data give reason to assume that in the 10th–13th centuries, the Alans already had their own unique written language based on the Greek alphabet. However, subsequent historical events resulted in this written tradition being lost. William of Rubruck, who met the Alans in the 13th century, mentioned that they had Greek writing.

After the Mongols destroyed the Alan state in the northern Caucasus in 1240, some Alans retreated to the mountains of the Caucasus and mixed with the indigenous population, becoming the modern-day Ossetians and their language developing into the Ossetian language.

== Phonology ==
With regard to historical phonology, the archaic Digor dialect of Ossetian is closest to Alanic. The main differences are:

- In Alanic the transition a > o before nasals has not occurred (ban 'day', nam 'name').
- Alanic lacked the ejective consonants pʼ, tʼ, tsʼ, chʼ, kʼ and kʷʼ, which were adopted by Ossetian from the Caucasian substrate, as well as kh (q), which was adopted from Turkic.

== Phrases ==
Well-known evidence of the Alanic language are the Alanic phrases in the Theogony of the Byzantine author John Tzetzes.

In 1927, the Hungarian Byzantinist I. Moravcsik discovered the full text of the epilogue to the Theogony in the 15th-century Barberinus manuscript in the Vatican Library. He published the work in 1930, which contained greeting formulas written in the Greek alphabet for the various languages that the Byzantine Empire had come into contact with in the 12th century. These languages included "Scythian" (in fact, the Cuman language), "Persian" (in fact, Turkish-Seljuk), Latin, Arabic, Russian, Hebrew and Alanic. Thus, this is the only written monument of Alanic whose ethnolinguistic affiliation has been attested by the person who wrote it.

The translation from Greek and Latin transliterations of greeting phrases in “barbarian” languages was published by S. M. Perevalov in 1998:

τοις Άλανοις προσφθέγγομαι κατά' την τούτων γλώσσαν

[I address the Alans in their language:]

καλή' ήμερα σου, αυ'θέτα μου, αρχόντισσα, πόθεν είσαι;

["Good day, my lord, Archontissa, where are you from?"]

ταπαγχας μέσφιλι χσινά κορθι καντά, και ταλλα.

[Tapankhas mesfili khsina korthi kanda and so on]

αν δ'εχη Άλάνισσα παπαν φίλον, α'κουσαις ταύτα.

[If an Alan has a (holy) father as her lover, you will hear this:]

Ουκ αίσχύνεσαι, αυθέντριά μου, να' γαμη το μουνίν σου παπάς

["Aren't you ashamed, my lady? After all, your father has relations with you"]

То φάρνετζ κίντζι μέσφιλι καιτζ φουα σαουγγε.

[Το 'farnetz kintzi mesfili kaitzfua saunge.']

The language of these phrases is an archaic version of the Ossetian language. Thus, Tapankhas ('good day') corresponds to Iron dæ bon xorz, Digor dæ bon xwarz 'let your day be good'. A similar phrase, daban horz, was found in the Jassic glossary of 1422.

Both phrases can be compared in their entirety with modern Ossetian analogues:

The first phrase, Tapankhas mesfili khsina korthi kanda, corresponds to the modern Ossetian (Digor):

Dæ bon xwarz, me ’fsijni ’xsijnæ. Kurdigæj dæ?

"Good afternoon, my master's mistress (wife). Where are you from?"

The second phrase, Farnetz kintzi mesfili kaitzfua saunge, corresponds to the Ossetian

’F(s)arm neci (’j) kindzi ’fsijni, kæci fæwwa sawgini.

— "There is no shame (for) a lady-daughter-in-law who is a priest's (given to a priest)".

There has also been a comparison of the word for horse in various Indo-Iranian languages and the reconstructed Alanic word for horse:

Language	Affiliation	Horse
Alanic		*asφa
Lithuanian	Baltic	ašvà
Sanskrit	Indo-Aryan	áśva
Khotanese	Northeastern Iranian	aśśa
Pashto	East Iranian	ās
Ossetian	Northeastern Iranian	ӕfsӕ(D)/efs(I)
Wakhi	Northeastern Iranian	yaš
Yaghnobi	Northeastern Iranian	asp
Avestan	Southeastern Iranian	aspa
Shughni	Southeastern Iranian	vorǰ
Balochi	Northwestern Iranian	asp
Kurdî	Northwestern Iranian	hesp
Median	Northwestern Iranian	aspa
Old Persian	Southwestern Iranian	asa
Middle Persian	Southwestern Iranian	asp
Persian	Southwestern Iranian	asb

== Zelenchuk inscription ==

The Zelenchuk inscription is a 10th-century inscription on a gravestone discovered by archaeologist Dmitry Strukov in 1888 on the right bank of the Bolshoy Zelenchuk river. It is considered the most famous written monument of the Alanic language or the oldest monument of the Ossetian language.

The inscription was read and published in 1893 by Academician Vsevolod Miller as follows:

Ις Χς

[Jesus Christ]

Οατς(?) Νικολαοή

[Saint (?) Nicholas]

Σαχηρη φουρτ

[Sakhir's son]

X… ρη φουρτ

[Χ... and son]

Πακαθαρ Πακαθαη φουρτ

[Bakatar Bakatai son]

Ανπαλ Αναπαλανη φουρτ

[Anbal Anabalan son]

λακανη τζηρθε (?)

[Monument to the Youth (?)]

<λακανητε ηρθε> (?)

[<Young men Ira (?)>]

According to the modern researcher T. T. Kambolov, the inscription can be deciphered as follows:

"Jesus Christ, Saint Nicholas, Sakhir son of Khors, Khors son of Bagatar, Bagatar son of Anbalan, Anbalan son of Lag - their graves."

It is assumed that the slab was installed on the site of a collective burial and that names were added as new graves appeared, which can be noticed from the some symbols being drawn differently.

In 1892, the inscription was rediscovered by G. I. Kulikovsky, which he made a new imprint of. This was the last time the monument was seen as expeditions in 1946 and 1964 failed to find the gravestone.
