= Odesa Archaeological Museum =

Museum in Ukraine

- Одеський археологічний музей
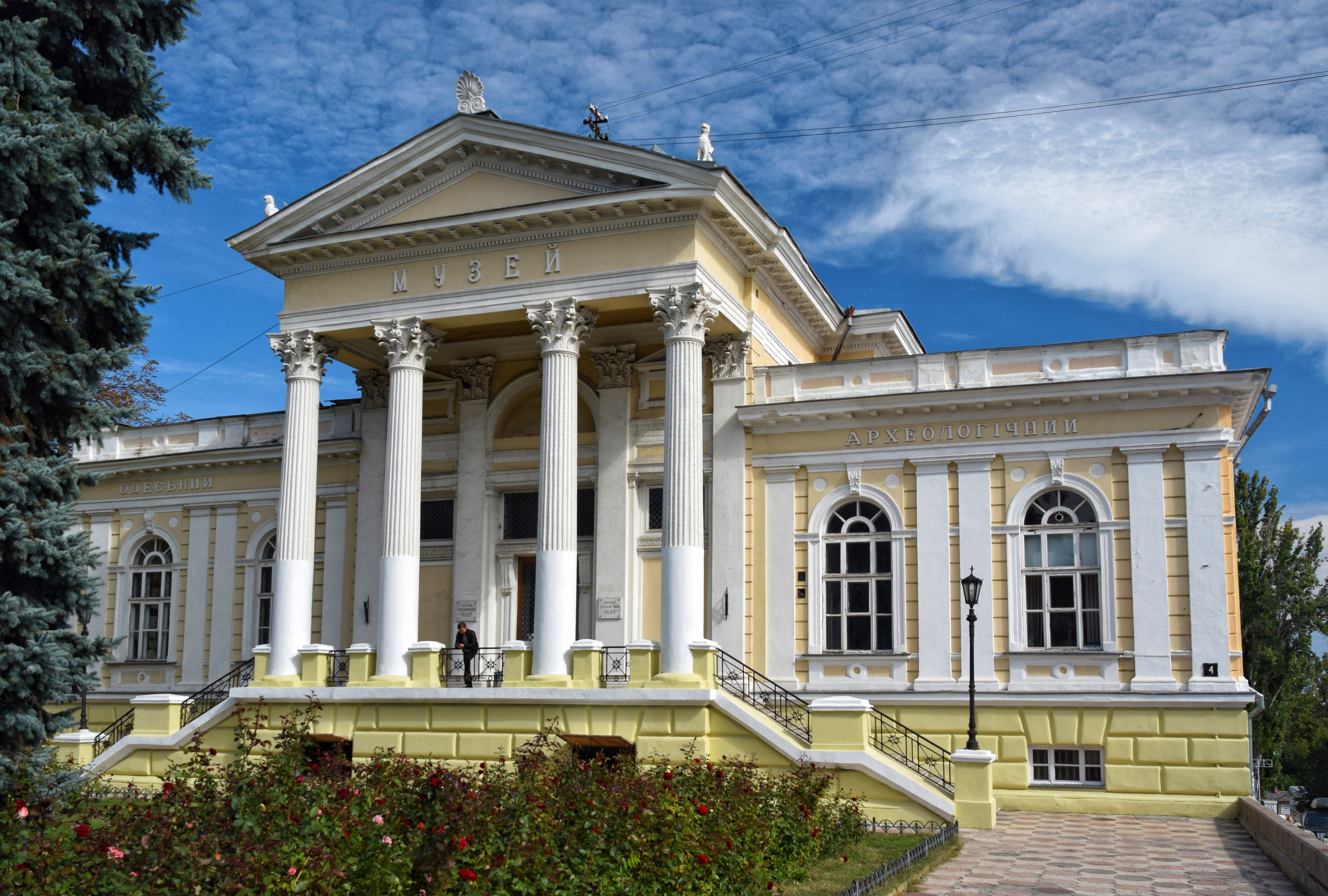
- Established: 1825
- Location: 4 Lanzheronivska Street, Ukraine, Odesa
- Coordinates: 46°29′6.13″N 30°44′38.3″E
- Collection size: 160,000
- Director: Ihor Bruyako
- Website: www.archaeology.odessa.ua

The Odesa Archaeological Museum (Ukrainian: Одеський археологічний музей, romanized: Odeskyi arkheolohichnyi muzei) is one of the oldest archaeological museums in Ukraine. It was founded in 1825; the current museum building was completed in 1883 according to a design by Polish architect Feliks Gąsiorowski.

The museum's address is 4 Lanzheronivska Street, 65026, Odesa, Ukraine.

== History ==
Founded in 1825 as the "Odessa City Museum of Antiquities" by Ivan Blaramberg. Its development was facilitated by the Imperial Odessa Society of History and Antiquities, which had the right to conduct excavations in the south Russian Empire.

- The first director of the museum was Ivan Blaramberg
- In 1913–1919 the museum was headed by Boris Varneke
- In 1930–1932 the director of the museum was Mikhail Boltenko
- In 1936–1937 Tikhon Vnukov was the director of the museum
- In 1959–1961 Moses Sinitsyn headed the archaeological museum.

Since 1997, the Odesa Archaeological Museum has functioned not only as a museum but also as an institute for scientific research into the archaeology of early human settlement in the Northern Black Sea region and the archaeology of the Middle Ages. The museum conducts expositions, restorations and publishing activities.

== Exhibition activity ==
The main fund of the museum is the largest collection of sources on the ancient history of the Northern Black Sea coast, it has more than 170 thousand archaeological sources of ancient history of southern Ukraine from the Stone Age to the Middle Ages, including 55 thousand coins, the only collection of monuments in Ukraine of Ancient Egypt, the largest collection of ancient rarities in the country.

The best examples of ancient sculpture are exhibited in the lobby of the building, specially built for the Public Library in 1883. The first two halls display materials covering the period from the advent of man to the second millennium BC. Of particular interest are finds from settlements and cemeteries of the Humelnytsia, Trypillia, and Usatovo cultures, burial mounds, and Bronze Age treasures, such as the Antonivsky Treasure.

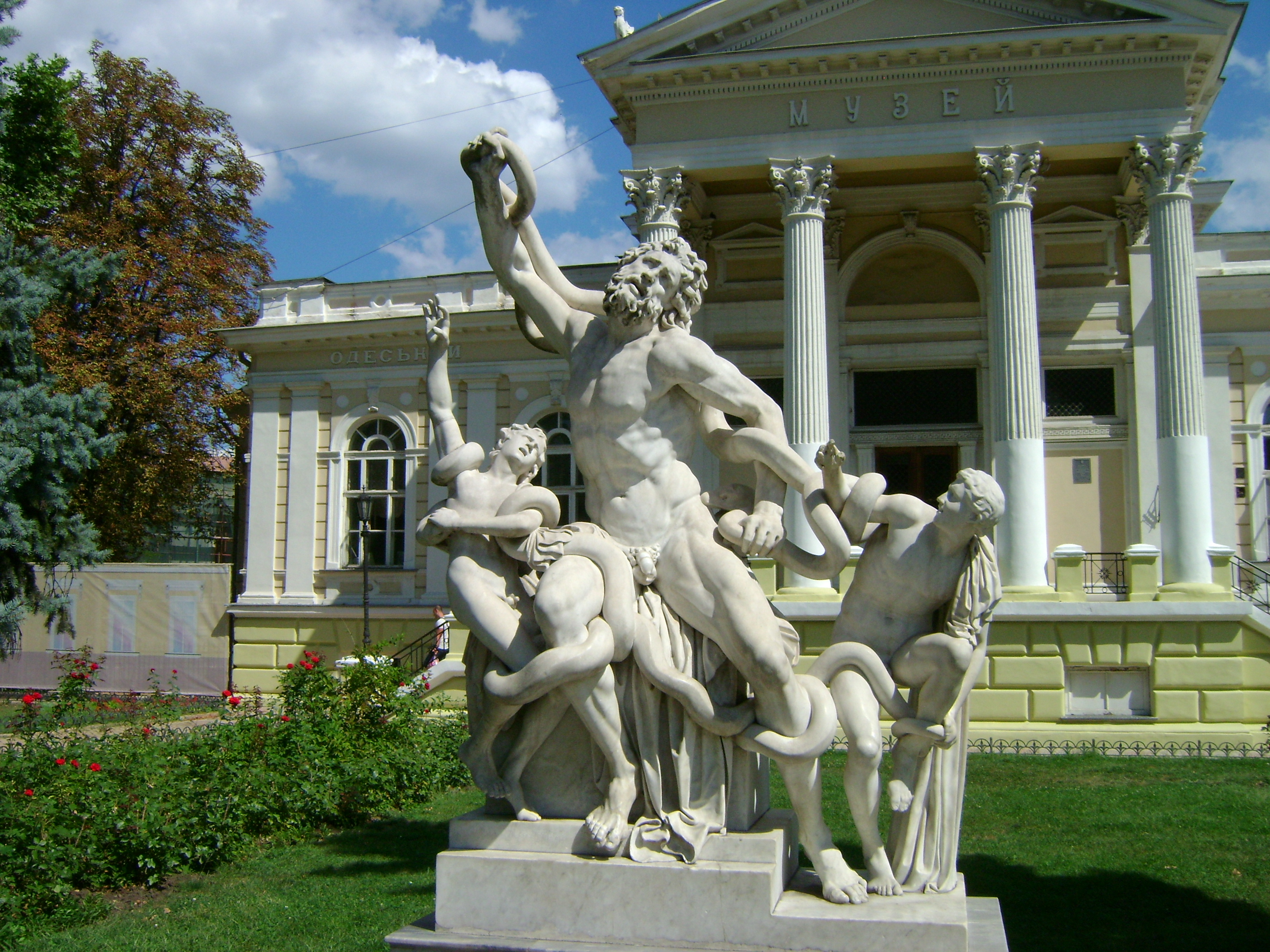
Sculpture group "Laokoon" at the entrance to the museum

The "Golden Pantry" of the museum exhibits real things made of precious metals, the oldest of which date back to the beginning of the second millennium BC. Decorations from Scythian and Sarmatian cemeteries, medieval burials of nomads, and products of Slavic craftsmen attract attention.

Out of the 50,000 coins stored in the museum, the rarest of gold and silver minted in ancient Greece, Rome, Byzantium, and Kyivan Rus are on display. In particular, the "gold coin" of Prince Volodymyr, one of the two in Ukraine and of 11 known, is on the display.

The collection of Egyptian antiquities is the third largest in the former USSR. Wooden and stone sarcophagus, funeral utensils, stone slabs and fragments of papyrus with hieroglyphs are of interest here.

== Research activities ==
The museum conducts extensive archaeological researches on many monuments of the Eneolithic and Bronze Ages (for example, the settlement of the late Trypillia culture Usatovo, Mayaki). Monuments of the Early Iron Age in the lower reaches of the Danube (Orlivka-Kartal), ancient times – on the banks of the Dniester estuary (the city of Nikonion), Odesa Bay – Tiligula are also studied. The museum expedition is conducting research on Snake Island.

The scientific activity of the museum is reflected in numerous publications, scientists of the museum maintain active scientific ties with Ukrainian and foreign colleagues. Joint research activities are conducted with specialists from Bulgaria, Great Britain, Greece, Denmark, Egypt, Germany, Poland, Romania, France and others. The museum participates in exhibitions abroad.

In the 1920s and 1930s there was a postgraduate course at the museum, in which future famous Odesa researchers studied (Virkau M.M., Sinitsyn M.S. and others).

== Gallery ==
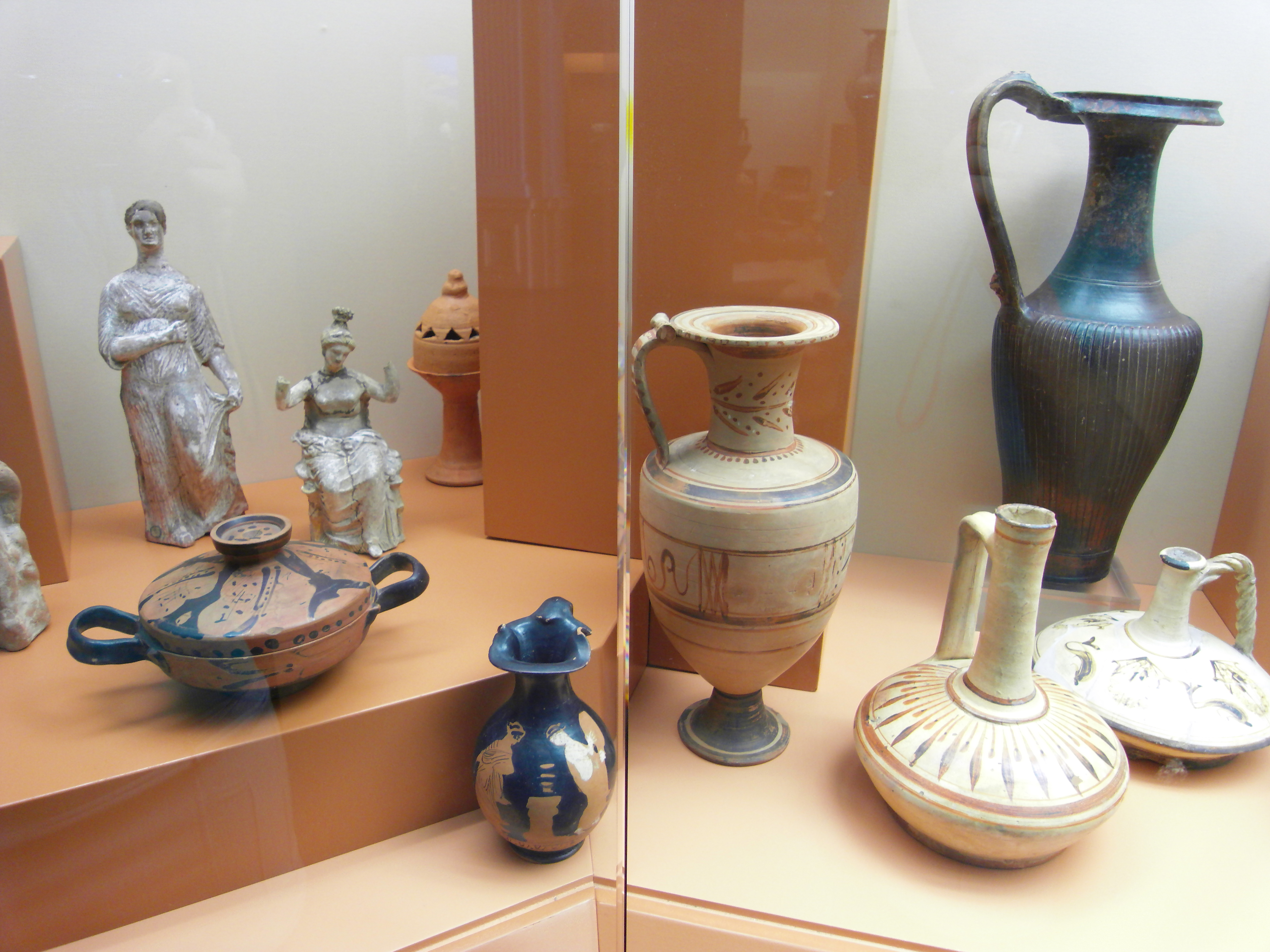
Pottery of Ancient Greece

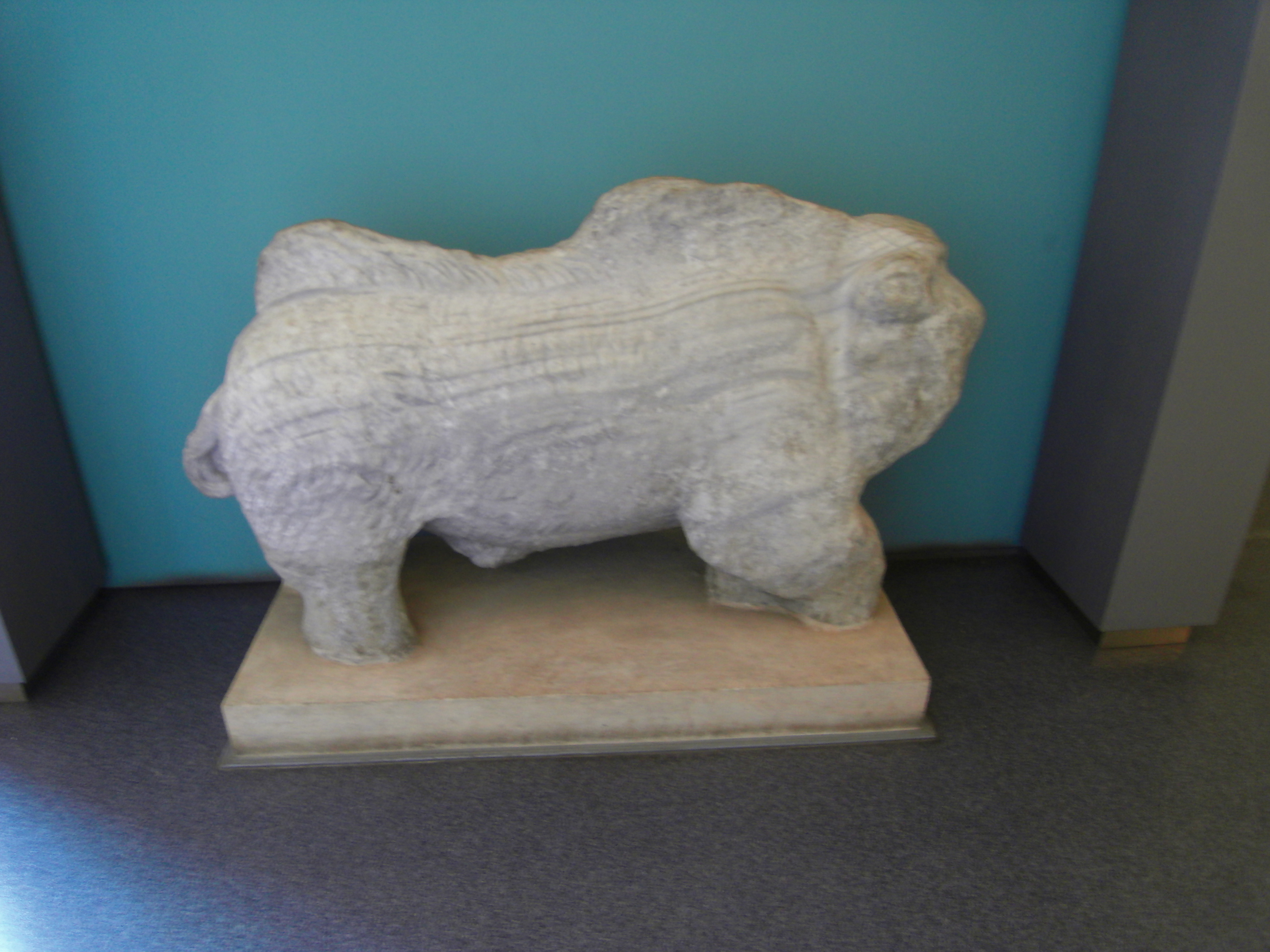
Marble bull, Niconium

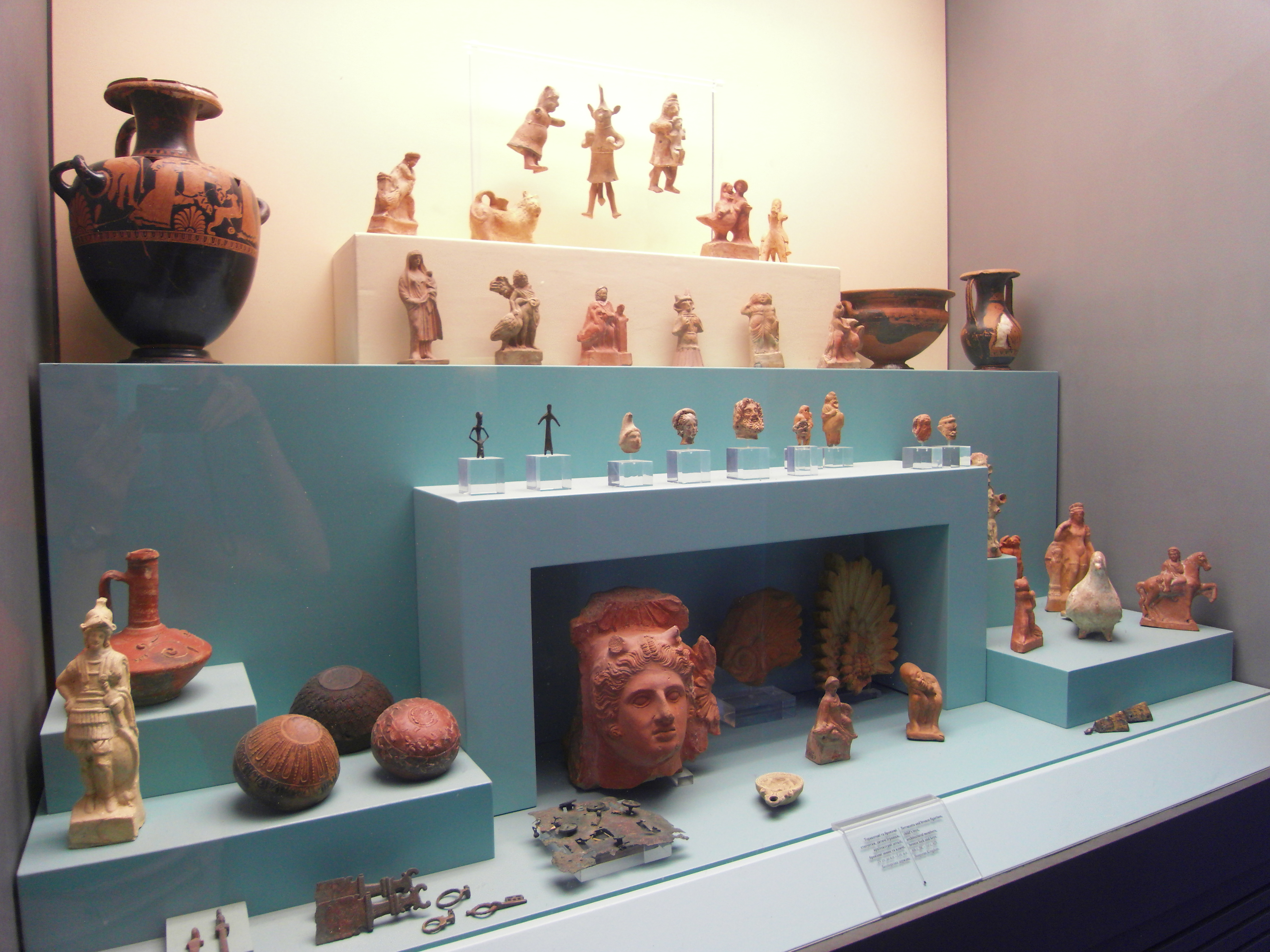
Terracotta and bronze figurines, Bosporan Kingdom

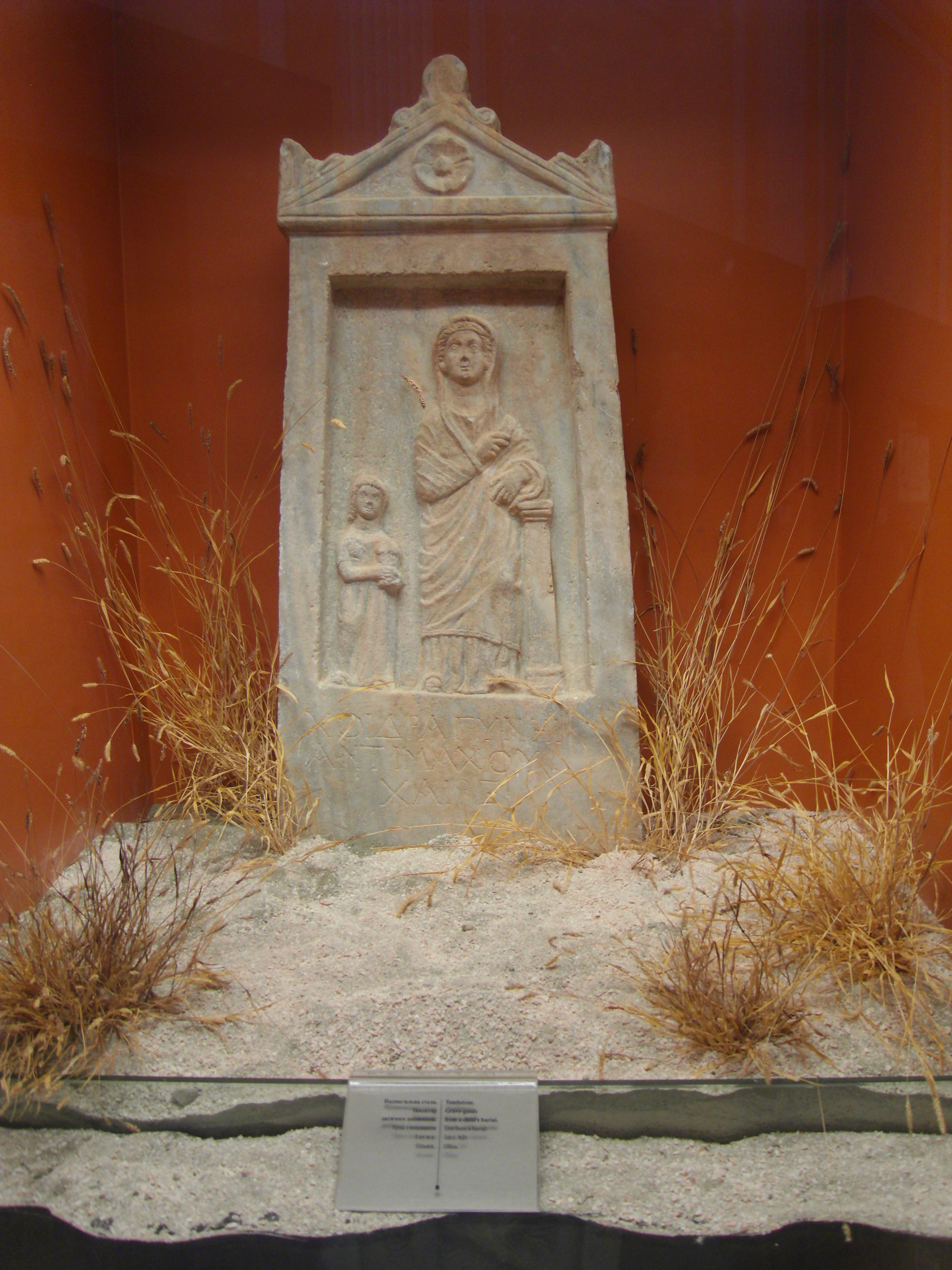
Funeral stele from Olbia

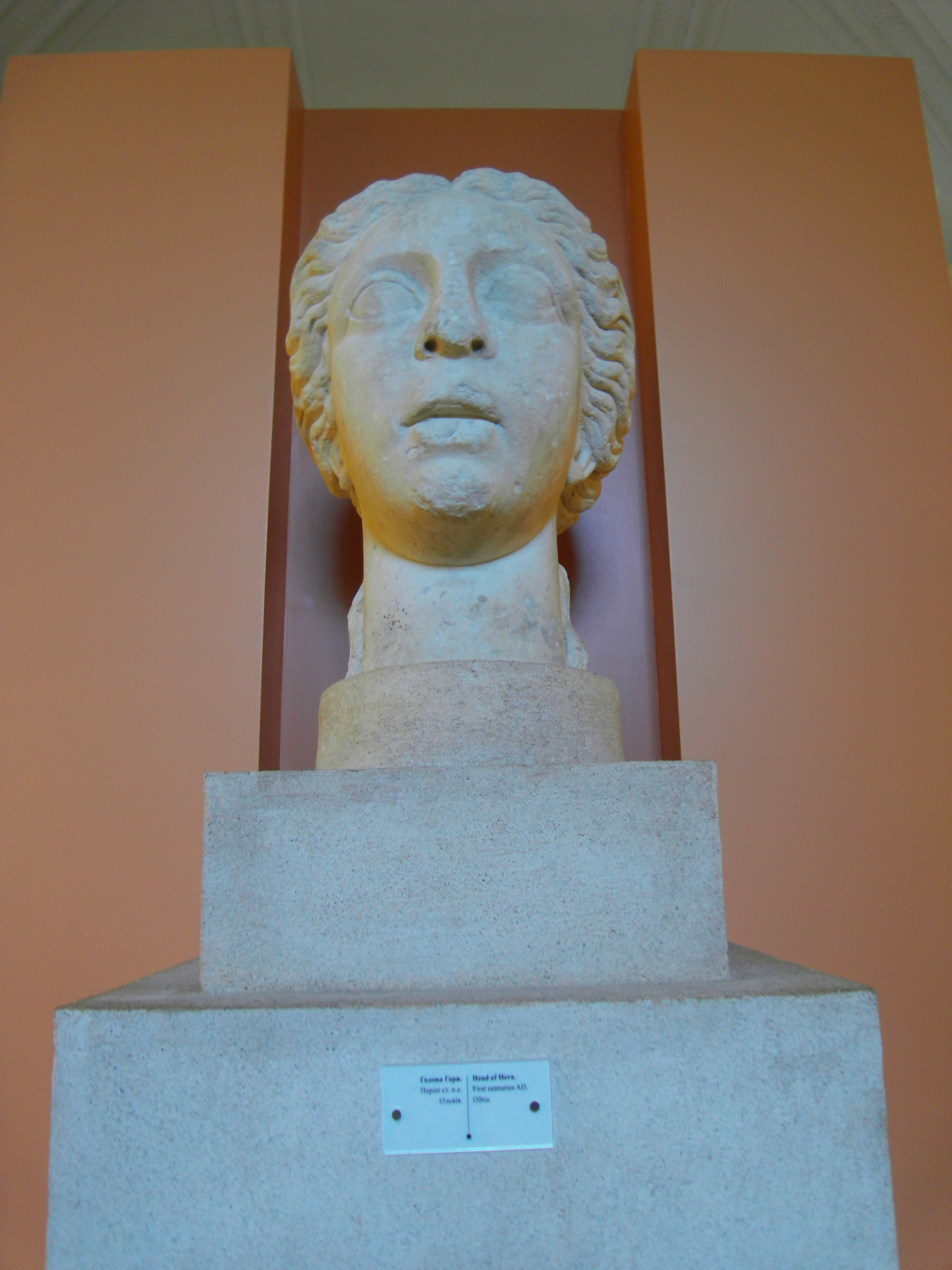
Head of Hera from Olbia

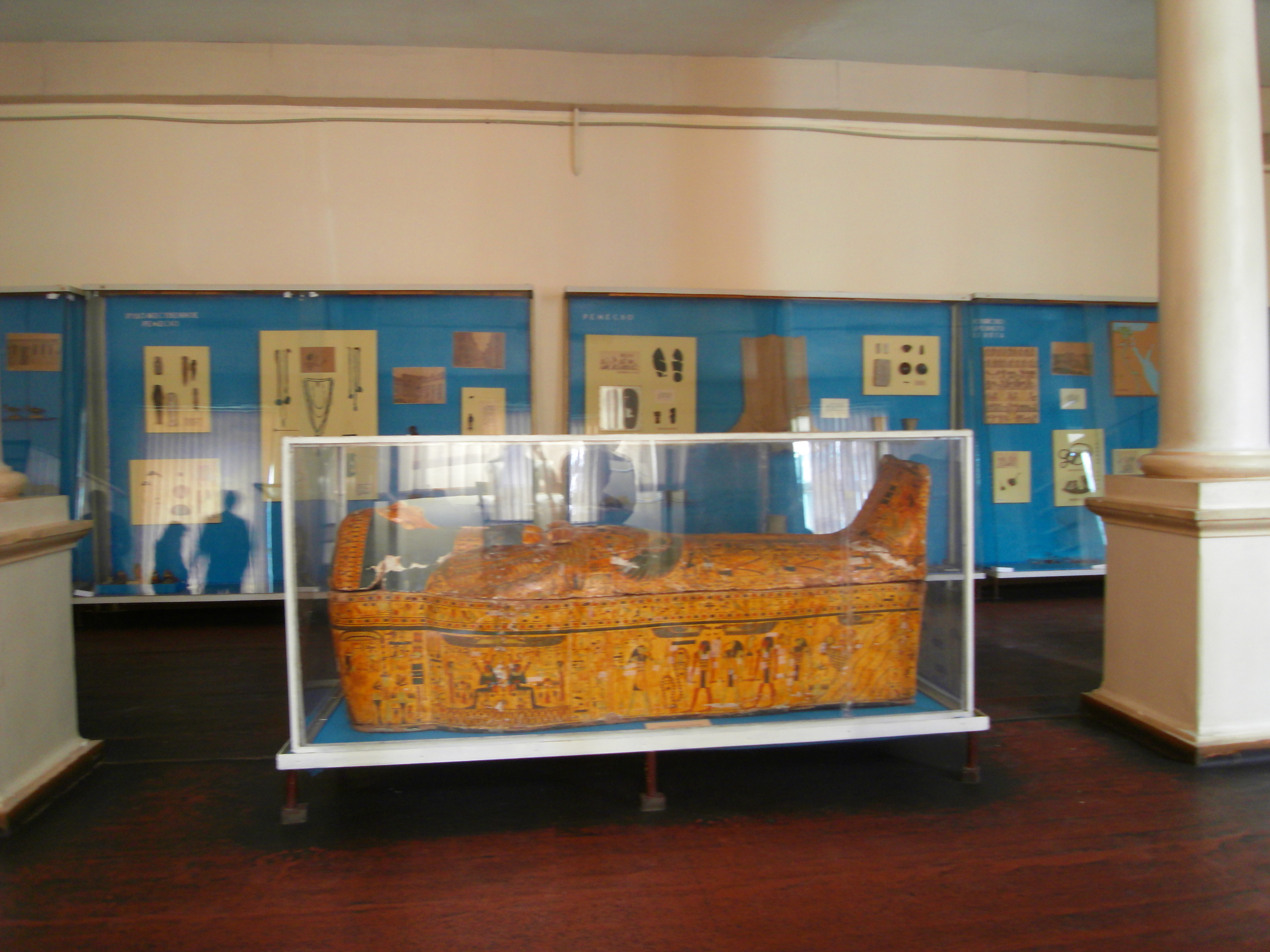
Ancient Egyptian sarcophagus
