= Scyles =

5th-century BC king of the Scythians

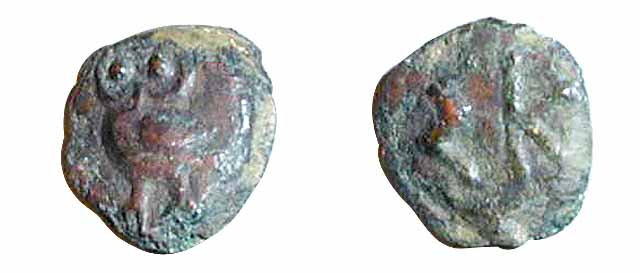
- Coins from Niconium bearing the name of Scyles

King of the Scythians
- Reign: c. 430 BCE
- Predecessor: Ariapeithes
- Successor: Octamasadas
- Spouse: Opoea unnamed Greek woman
- Scythian: Skula
- Religion: Scythian religion

Scyles, Skyles, or Scylas (Scythian: Skula; Ancient Greek: Σκύλης, romanized: Skulēs; Latin: Scyles), was a Scythian king who lived in the 5th century BC. He is mentioned in the histories of Herodotus as having been an admirer of Greek culture and traditions, which led to his falling out of favor with his people and being executed by his brother.

== Name ==
Skúlēs (Σκύλης) is a Hellenization of the Scythian endonym *Skula, itself a later dialectal form of *Skuδa resulting from a sound change from /δ/ to /l/.

== Life ==
Scyles was the heir and son of the king Ariapeithes and a Greek woman from Istria. His mother taught him to read and speak the Greek language, which distinguished him from other Scythians, who were illiterate. Because of his mixed heritage, he was ambivalent toward the culture of his father and displayed many Hellenic traits. For example, he built a large house in Pontic Olbia and married a Greek woman, both unheard of practices because the Scythians were largely nomadic and polygamous. He also publicly took part in Bacchic rites, to the anger of other Scythian chiefs.

According to Herodotus, it was because of these unconventional traits that the Scythians rebelled against Scyles, and he was forced to flee from his homeland. He escaped to the Thracian king Sitalces. However, he was pursued by his brother Octamasadas, who raised an army and marched on Thrace. In the midst of the war between the Scythians and Thracians, Sitalces and Octamasadas agreed on the extradition of Scyles in exchange for the release of Sitalces' brother from Scythian detainment. Scyles was handed over and executed.

Coins bearing the name of Scyles have been found in Niconium, where it is thought that Scyles was buried.

== Sources ==
- Ivantchik, Askold (2018). "Scythians". Encyclopædia Iranica. New York City, United States: Encyclopædia Iranica Foundation; Brill Publishers.
- Sherwin-White, Susan M.; Kuhrt, Amélie (1993). From Samarkhand to Sardis: A New Approach to the Seleucid Empire. Berkeley, United States: University of California Press. ISBN 978-0-520-08183-3.
- Wheeler, James Talboys (1855). The life and travels of Herodotus in the fifth century: before Christ: an imaginary biography founded on fact, illustrative of the history, manners, religion, literature, arts, and social condition of the Greeks, Egyptians, Persians, Babylonians, Hebrews, Scythians, and other ancient nations, in the days of Pericles and Nehemiah. Longman, Green.
- Metelkin, N. V. (2006). Сокровища и ненайденые клады Украины (К). Olma Media Group. ISBN 978-5-373-00246-2.

== See also ==
- The History of Herodotus, vol. 1 at Project Gutenberg (translation by George Campbell Macaulay, 1852–1915)
- The History of Herodotus, vol. 2 at Project Gutenberg
- А.Г Загинайло П. О. Карышковский. Монеты cкифского царя Скила [Coins of Scythian King Scylus] // Нумизматические исследования по истории Юго-Восточной Европы: Сборник научых трудов. – Кишинёв: Штиинца, 1990. – С. 3 – 15
- Загинайло А.Г. Литые монеты царя Скила. // Древнее Причерноморье. – Одесса, 1990. – С. 64–71.
- Одесский музей нумизматике. Никоний
- Odessa State Museum of Archaeology

Scyles Ariapeithes's dynasty (?)
Regnal titles
| Preceded by Ariapeithes | King of the Scythians c. 450 BCE | Succeeded by Octamasadas |
