= Ariapeithes =

5th-century BC Scythian king

King of the Scythians
- Reign: c. 450 BCE
- Predecessor: Idanthyrsus (?)
- Successor: Skula
- Spouses: unnamed Greek woman unnamed Thracian princess Hupāyā
- Issue: Skula; Uxtamazatā; Varika
- Scythian: Aryapaiϑah
- Religion: Scythian religion

Ariapeithes (Scythian: Aryapaiϑah; Ancient Greek: Αριαπειθης, romanized: Ariapeithēs) was a king of the Scythians in the early 5th century BCE.

== Name ==
Ariapeithes's name originates from the Scythian name *Ariyapaiϑah, and is composed of the terms *Ariya-, meaning "Aryan" and "Iranian," and *paiϑah-, meaning "decoration" and "adornment."

== Life ==
Ariyapaiϑah had three wives, each of whom bore him one son:

- an unnamed Greek woman from Istria, who became the mother of Skula
- an unnamed daughter of the Thracian king Tērēs I, who became the mother of Uxtamazatā
- a Scythian woman named Hupāyā (Ancient Greek: Οποιη, romanized: Opoiē; Latin: Opoea), who became the mother of Varika (Ancient Greek: Ορικος, romanized: Orikos; Latin: Oricus)

== Death ==
Ariyapaiϑah was treacherously killed by Spargapaiϑah, the king of the Agathyrsi, after which Skula became the king of the Scythians, and took his stepmother Hupāyā as one of his wives.

== Sources ==
- Hinz, Walther [in German] (1975). Altiranisches Sprachgut der Nebenüberleiferung [Old Iranian Language from Collateral Sources] (in German). Wiesbaden, Germany: Harrassowitz. ISBN 3-447-01703-1.
- Rolle, Renate (1989). The World of the Scythians. Berkeley, United States: University of California Press. p. 123. ISBN 978-0-520-06864-3.
- Schmitt, Rüdiger (2003). "Die skythischen Personennamen bei Herodot" [Scythian Personal Names in Herodotus] (PDF). Annali dell'Università degli Studi di Napoli l'Orientale (in German). 63: 1–31.
- Schmitt, Rüdiger (2011). Iranisches Personennamenbuch [Book of Iranian Personal Names] (in German). Vol. 5.5a. Verlag der Österreichischen Akademie der Wissenschaften. pp. 341–342. ISBN 978-3-700-17142-3.
- Sherwin-White, Susan M.; Kuhrt, Amélie (1993). From Samarkhand to Sardis: A New Approach to the Seleucid Empire. Berkeley, United States: University of California Press. ISBN 978-0-520-08183-3.

Ariyapaiϑah
Regnal titles
Preceded by Idanthyrsus (?)	King of the Scythians c. 450 BCE	Succeeded by Skula
