= Spargapeithes (Agathyrsian king) =

5th century BC Scythian Agathyrsi tribe king

Spargapeithes (Scythian: Spargapaiϑah; Ancient Greek: Σπαργαπειθης, romanized: Spargapeíthēs; Latin: Spargapeithes) was the name of a king of the Scythic tribe of the Agathyrsoi.

== Name ==
Spargapeithes's name originates from the Scythian name *Spargapaiϑah, and is composed of the terms *sparga-, meaning “scion” and “descendant,” and *paiϑah-, meaning “decoration” and “adornment.”

The name of Spargapeithes and that of the Massagetaean prince Spargapises (Scythian: *Spargapis) are variants of the same name, and both forms, Spargapis and Spargapaiϑah, are cognates of the Avestan name Sparəγa-paēsa (𐬯𐬞𐬀𐬭𐬆𐬖𐬀⸱𐬞𐬀𐬉𐬯𐬀).

== Reign ==
According to the Greek historian Herodotus, Spargapeithes treacherously killed the Scythian king Ariapeithes.

== See also ==
- List of kings of Thrace and Dacia

== Sources ==
- Hinz, Walther [in German] (1975). Altiranisches Sprachgut der Nebenüberleiferung [Old Iranian Language from Collateral Sources] (in German). Wiesbaden, Germany: Harrassowitz. ISBN 3-447-01703-1.
- Kullanda, Sergei [in Russian] (2014). "External relations of Scythian". Journal of Language Relationship. 11 (1). Piscataway, United States: Gorgias Press: 81–90. doi:10.31826/jlr-2014-110110.
- Schmitt, Rüdiger (2003). "Die skythischen Personennamen bei Herodot" [Scythian Personal Names in Herodotus] (PDF). Annali dell'Università degli Studi di Napoli l'Orientale (in German). 63: 1–31.
- Schmitt, Rüdiger (2011). Iranisches Personennamenbuch [Book of Iranian Personal Names] (in German). Vol. 5.5a. Verlag der Österreichischen Akademie der Wissenschaften. pp. 341–342. ISBN 978-3-700-17142-3.
- Sherwin-White, Susan M.; Kuhrt, Amélie (1993). From Samarkhand to Sardis: A New Approach to the Seleucid Empire. Berkeley, United States: University of California Press. ISBN 978-0-520-08183-3.

== See also ==
- List of rulers of Thrace and Dacia
