= Spargapeithes =

Spargapeithes was the name of a number of kings of various peoples belonging to Scythian cultures.

- Spargapeithes (Scythian king), a king of the Scythians
- Spargapises, a prince of the Massagetae
- Spargapeithes (Agathyrsian king), a king of the Agathyrsi
