= Dacian fortress of Stâncești =

- Cetatea de la Bobeica
- Location within Romania
- 47.74°N 26.59°E
- Location: Dealul Șanţului), Stâncești, Botoșani County, Romania

Site notes
- Condition: Ruined

Monument istoric
- Reference no.: BT-I-s-B-20405

It was a Dacian fortified town.
