= Nikōnion =

Ancient Greek city

Nikōnion / Nikōnia
- Νικώνιον / Νικωνία (Ancient Greek)
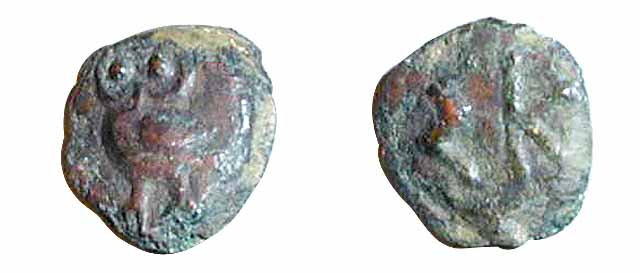
- Coins from Nikōnion bearing the name of Scyles

- Location within Ukraine
- 46°11′0″N 30°26′13″E
- Type: Settlement
- Periods: Archaic Greek to Roman Imperial
- Cultures: Greek
- Location: Roksolany, Odesa Oblast, Ukraine

History
- Built: Second half of the 6th century BC
- Built by: Settlers from Miletus
- Abandoned: Middle of the 3rd century AD

Site notes
- Area: 7 ha (17 acres)
- Condition: Ruined and partially submerged
- Public access: Yes

Immovable Monument of National Significance of Ukraine
- Official name: Городище Роксолани - стародавнє місто Ніконій (Roksolany hillfort - the ancient city of Nikonion)
- Type: Archaeology
- Reference no.: 150018-Н

Nikōnion (Ancient Greek: Νικώνιον; Latin: Niconium) and Nikōnia (Ancient Greek: Νικωνία) was an ancient Greek city on the east bank of the Dniester estuary. Its ruins are located 300 meters to the northwest of the modern village Roksolany, in the Odesa Raion of the Odesa Oblast, Ukraine.

== History ==
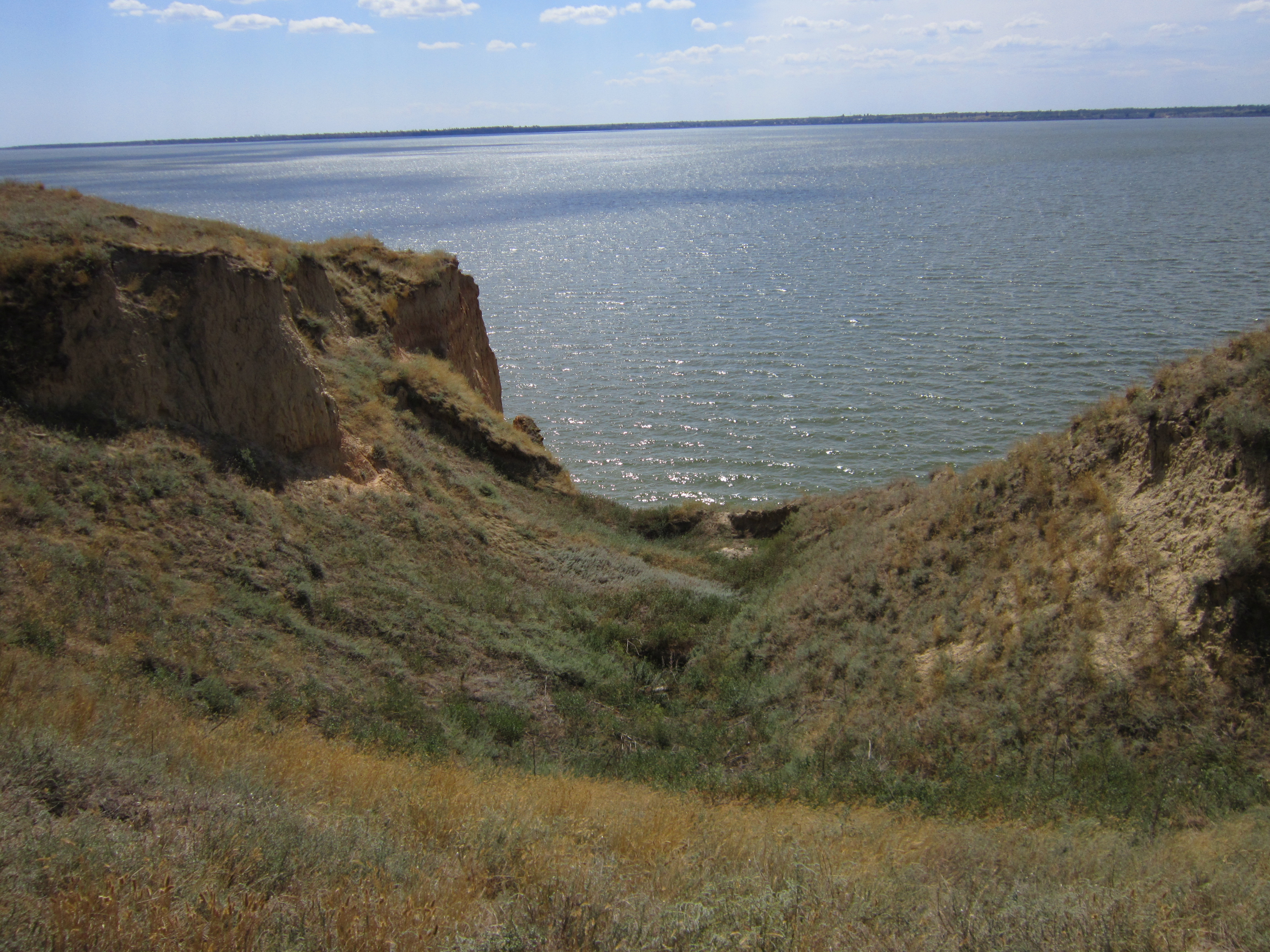
The site of Nikōnion

Nikōnion was founded in the second half of the 6th century BC by colonists from Miletus. On the opposite bank of the river other Milesian colonists had already founded Tyras. The city was founded at a time when many nomadic tribes were beginning to settle in the areas north of the Black Sea. The Greeks settled in this area because of the plentiful fishing and the opportunity to trade with these barbarian settlers.

Stone construction in the city began in the 5th century. At the turn of the 3rd-2nd centuries BC, the city was destroyed, an event which was associated with the Macedonian commander Zopyrion, associate of Alexander the Great. In the 1st century BC, the size of the city increased from the previous period. Nikōnion was abandoned permanently in the middle of the third century AD when the area was invaded by the Goths during the Great Migrations.

== Archaeological excavations ==
The city was located on a plateau which now descends steeply into the Dniestr estuary, which has submerged the lower terrace of the city. The size of the city is estimated to be 7 hectares (17 acres).

According to the findings of excavations in the area, it appears that in the 5th-4th centuries BC, the money in Nikōnion mostly consisted of Histrian coins. It is also possible that Nikōnion itself minted coins, because some of the coins discovered during excavation are unique in appearance and bear the name of the Scythian king Scyles, who had established a protectorate over Nikōnion and other settlements in the area and may have been buried in the city.
