= Dacian fortress of Cotnari =

- Location within Romania
- 47.34°N 26.94°E
- Location: Platoul Cătălina, Cotnari, Iași, Romania

History
- Built: 4th or 3rd century BC

Site notes
- Condition: Ruined

It was a Dacian fortified town.
