= Cimmerian language =

Extinct Eastern Iranic language

Cimmerian
- Kimmerian
- Native to: Russia
- Region: Caspian Steppe, North Caucasus, West Asia
- Ethnicity: Cimmerians
- Extinct: late 7th-early 6th centuries BC
- Language family: Indo-European: Indo-Iranian; Iranic; Eastern Iranic; Scythian; Cimmerian

Language codes
- ISO 639-3: None (mis)
- Linguist List: 08i
- Glottolog: None
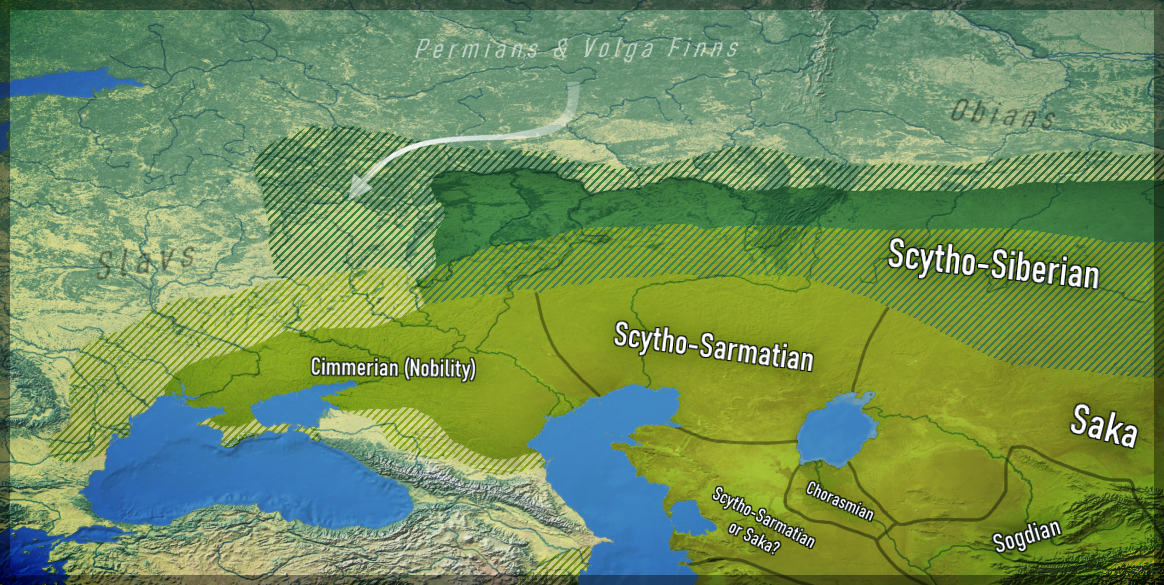
- Map of the Scythian languages, including Cimmerian

Cimmerian is an extinct language spoken by the Cimmerians in the 8th century BC that remains largely unattested.

== Classification ==
According to the historian Muhammad Dandamayev and the linguist János Harmatta, Cimmerian was a dialect belonging to the Scythian group of Iranic languages and Cimmerians had the ability to communicate with Scythians proper without needing interpreters. According to Igor Diakonoff, the Cimmerians spoke a Scythian language belonging to the eastern branch of the Iranic language. The Scythologist Askold Ivantchik also considers the Cimmerians to have been linguistically very close to the Scythians.

The Iranologist Ľubomír Novák considers Cimmerian to be a relative of Scythian which exhibited similar features as Scythian, such as the evolution of the sound /d/ into /ð/ and then /l/.

== Vocabulary ==
=== Proper names ===
The recorded personal names of the Cimmerians were either Iranic, reflecting their origins, or Anatolian, reflecting the cultural influence of the native populations of Asia Minor on them after their migration there. Only a few personal names in the Cimmerian language have survived in Assyrian inscriptions:

- Teušpâ (Neo-Assyrian Akkadian: 𒁹𒋼𒍑𒉺) or Teušpâ (𒁹𒋼𒍑𒉺𒀀):
  - According to the linguist János Harmatta, it goes back to Old Iranic *Tavispaya, meaning "swelling with strength", although Askold Ivantchik has criticised this proposal on phonetic grounds.
  - Askold Ivantchik instead posits three alternative suggestions for an Old Iranic origin of Teušpâ:
    - *Taiu-aspa "abductor of horses"
    - *Taiu-spā "abductor dog"
    - *Daiva-spā "divine dog"
- Dugdammî or Tugdammî (Neo-Assyrian Akkadian: 𒁹𒌇𒁮𒈨𒄿), and recorded as Lugdamis (Λυγδαμις) and Dugdamis (Δυγδαμις) by Greek authors
  - K. T. Vitchak has proposed that it was derived from an Old Iranic form *Duγδamaiši, meaning "owner of milk-producing sheep."
  - According to the Scythologist Sergey Tokhtas’ev, the original form of this name was likely *Dugdamiya, formed from the word *dugda, meaning "milk."
  - Ľubomír Novák has noted that the attestation of this name in the forms Dugdammî and Tugdammî in Akkadian and the forms Lugdamis and Dugdamis in Greek shows that its first consonant had experienced the change of the sound /d/ to /l/, which is consistent with the phonetic changes attested in the Scythian languages.
- Sandakšatru (Neo-Assyrian Akkadian: 𒁹𒊓𒀭𒁖𒆳𒊒, romanized: Sandakšatru): this is an Iranic reading of the name, and Manfred Mayrhofer (1981) points out that the name may also be read as Sandakurru.
  - According to János Harmatta, it goes back to Old Iranic *Sandakuru "splendid son."
  - Askold Ivantchik derives the name Sandakšatru from a compound term consisting of the name of the Anatolian deity Šanta, and of the Iranic term -xšaθra.

== Notes ==
- Harmatta, János (1996). "10.4.1. The Scythians". In Hermann, Joachim; Zürcher, Erik; Harmatta, János; Litvak, J. K.; Lonis, R. [in French]; Obenga, T.; Thapar, R.; Zhou, Yiliang (eds.). From the Seventh Century B.C. to the Seventh Century A.D. History of Humanity. Vol. 3. London, United Kingdom; New York City, United States; Paris, France: Routledge; UNESCO. pp. 181–182. ISBN 978-9-231-02812-0.
- Novák, Ľubomír (2013). Problem of Archaism and Innovation in the Eastern Iranian Languages. Charles University.
- Diakonoff, I. M. (1985). "Media". In Gershevitch, Ilya (ed.). The Cambridge History of Iran. Vol. 2. Cambridge, United Kingdom: Cambridge University Press. pp. 36–148. ISBN 978-0-521-20091-2.
- Ivantchik, Askold (1993a). Les Cimmériens au Proche-Orient [The Cimmerians in the Near East] (PDF) (in French). Fribourg, Switzerland; Göttingen, Germany: Editions Universitaires (Switzerland); Vandenhoeck & Ruprecht (Germany). ISBN 978-3-727-80876-0.
- Ivantchik, Askold (2001). "The Current State of the Cimmerian Problem". Ancient Civilizations from Scythia to Siberia. 7 (3): 307–339. doi:10.1163/15700570152758043.
