= Scythian languages =

Group of Eastern Iranic languages

Scythian
- Scythic
- Geographic distribution: Central Asia, West Asia, Eastern Europe
- Ethnicity: Scythians, Sarmatians, Alans , Parni,
- Linguistic classification: Indo-European: Indo-Iranian; Iranian; Eastern; Sogdo-Scythian; Scythian
- Subdivisions: Alanic; Cimmerian †; Pontic Scythian †; Saka-Wakhi

Language codes
- Glottolog: osse1245 Ossetic
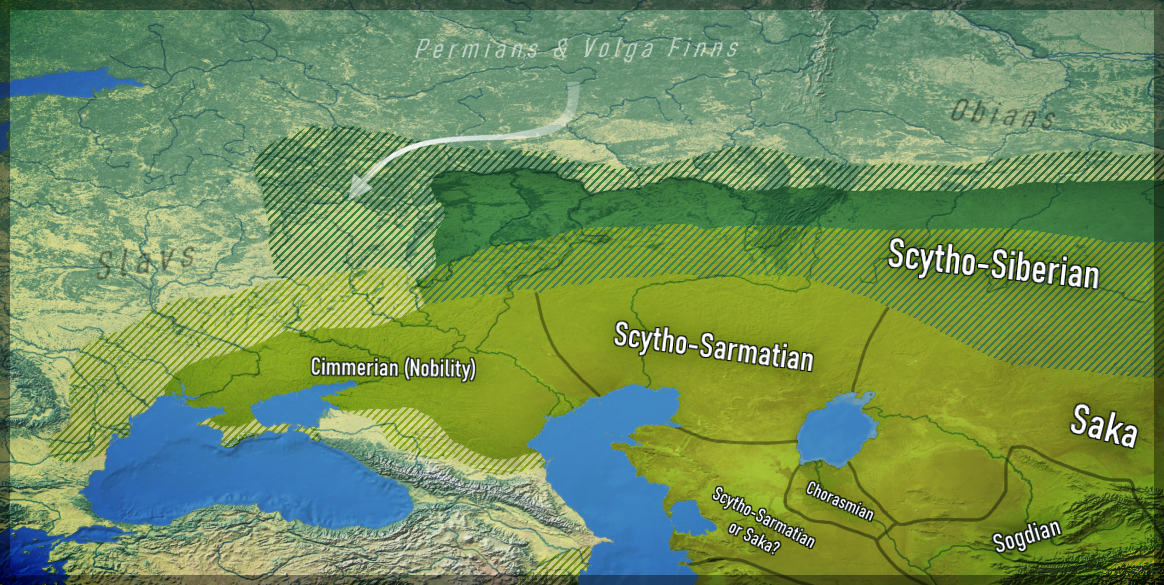
- The approximate distribution of Eastern Iranic languages and peoples in 100 BC appears in green.

The Scythian languages (/ˈsɪθiən/ or /ˈsɪðiən/ or /ˈskɪθiən/) are a group of Eastern Iranic languages of the classical and late antique period (the Middle Iranic period), spoken in a vast region of Eurasia by the populations belonging to the Scythian cultures and their descendants. The dominant ethnic groups among the Scythian-speakers were nomadic pastoralists of Central Asia and the Pontic–Caspian steppe. Fragments of their speech known from inscriptions and words quoted in ancient authors as well as analysis of their names indicate that it was an Indo-European language, more specifically from the Iranic group of Indo-Iranic languages.

Most of the Scythian languages eventually became extinct, except for modern Ossetian (which descends from the Alanic dialect of Scytho-Sarmatian). Alexander Lubotsky summarizes the known linguistic landscape as follows:

Unfortunately, we know next to nothing about the Scythian of that period [Old Iranian] – we have only a couple of personal and tribal names in Greek and Persian sources at our disposal – and cannot even determine with any degree of certainty whether it was a single language.

== Classification ==
Ossetian is an Eastern Iranic language. The vast majority of Scythological scholars agree in considering the Scythian languages a part of the Eastern Iranic languages too. This relies principally on the fact that the Greek inscriptions of the Northern Black Sea Coast contain several hundreds of Sarmatian names showing a close affinity to the Ossetian language.

Some scholars detect a division of Scythian into two dialects: a western, more conservative dialect, and an eastern, more innovative one. The Scythian languages may have formed a dialect continuum:

- Alanic languages or Scytho-Sarmatian in the west: were spoken by people originally of Iranic stock from the 8th and 7th century BC onwards in the area of Ukraine, Southern Russia and Kazakhstan.
  - Modern Ossetian survives as a continuation of the language family possibly represented by Scytho-Sarmatian inscriptions, although the Scytho-Sarmatian language family "does not simply represent the same [Ossetian] language" at an earlier date.
- Saka languages or Scytho-Khotanese in the east: spoken in the first century in the Kingdom of Khotan (located in present-day Xinjiang, China), and including the Khotanese of Khotan and Tumshuqese of Tumshuq. Often associated with the historical Saka of Central Asia and the elite of the Indo-Scythian Kingdom, however, this notion has been recently criticized and Khotanese belongs to a separate nuclei than the Scytho-Sarmatian languages within (Eastern) Iranic.
  - Modern Wakhi is considered to be the closest living relative of Khotanese and Tumshuqese.

It is highly probable that already in the Old Iranic period, there were some eastern Scythian dialects which gave rise to the ancestor(s) of the Sogdian and Yaghnobi languages, although data required to test this hypothesis is presently lacking.

The Scythian languages shared some features with other Eastern Iranic languages, such as the use of the suffix -ta to denote the plural form, which is also present in Sogdian, Chorasmian, Ossetian, and Yaghnobi. This again hints towards the idea that these languages share more recent common ancestry through the existence of a possible Northeastern Iranian dialect cluster.

== History ==
Early Eastern Iranic peoples originated in the Yaz culture (ca. 1500–1100 BC) in Central Asia. The Scythians migrated from Central Asia toward Eastern Europe in the 8th and 7th century BC, occupying today's Southern Russia and Ukraine and the Carpathian Basin and parts of Moldova and Dobruja. They disappeared from history after the Hunnic invasion of Europe in the 5th century AD, and Turkic (Avar, Batsange, etc.) and Slavic peoples probably assimilated most people speaking Scythian. However, in the Caucasus, the Ossetian language belonging to the Scythian linguistic continuum remains in use today.

== See also ==
- Getae
- Dacian language
