= Tomyris =

6th-century BC queen of the Massagetae

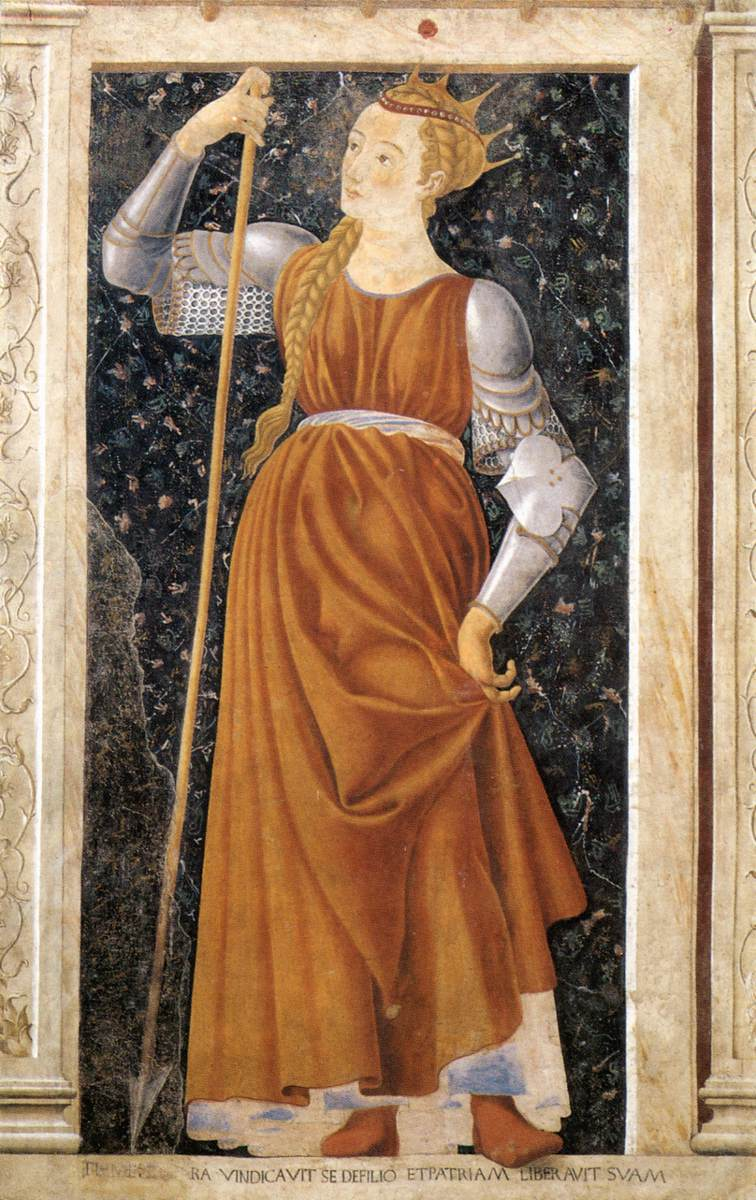
- Tomyris as imagined by Castagno, 15th century

Queen of the Massagetae
- Reign: unknown – c. 520s BC
- Predecessor: unnamed husband
- Successor: Skunkha (?)
- Died: c. 520s BC
- Spouse: unnamed husband
- Issue: Spargapises
- Religion: Scythian religion

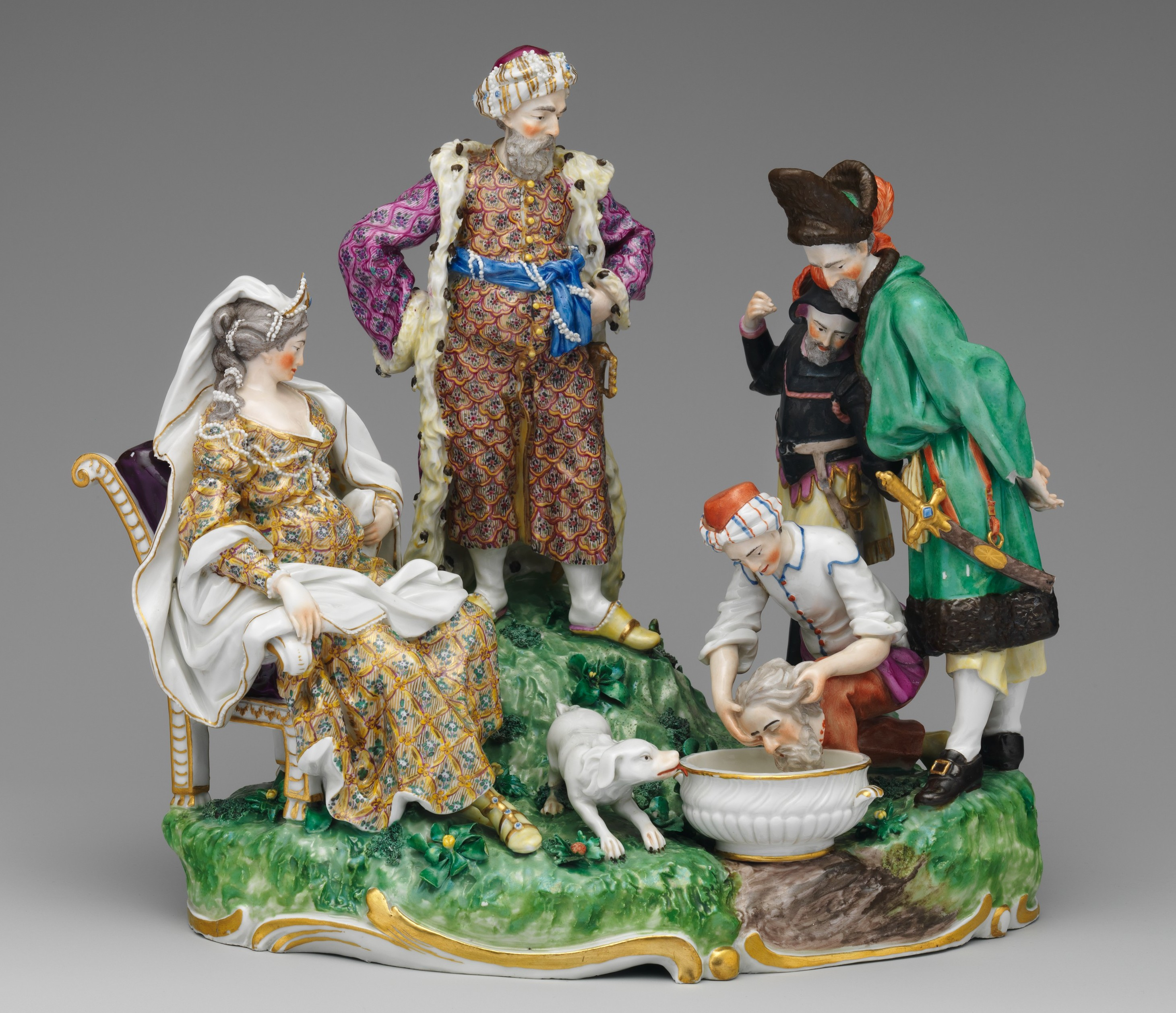
Tomyris and the Head of Cyrus, Frankenthal porcelain, c. 1773

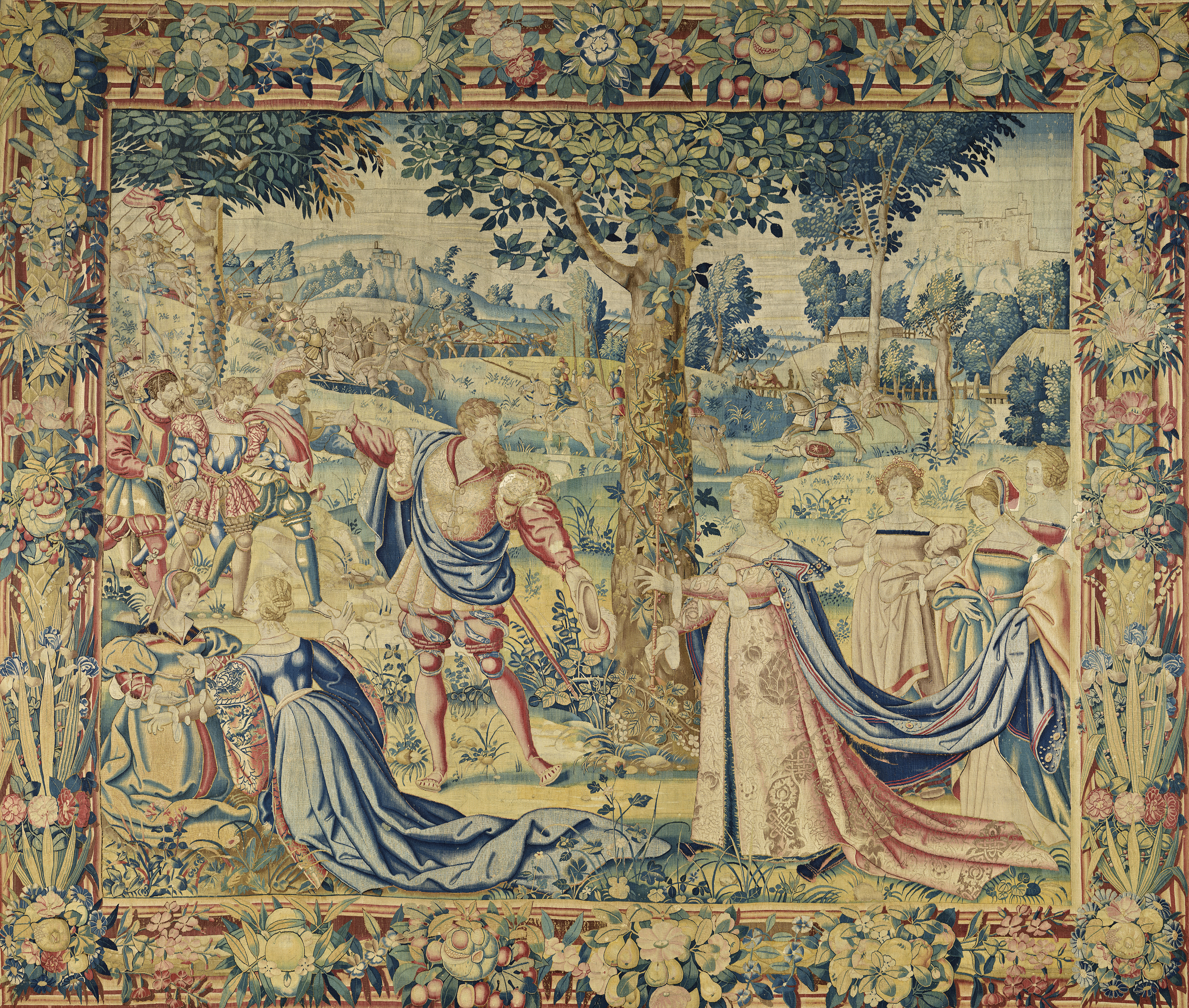
Queen Tomyris learns that her son Spargapises has been taken alive by Cyrus, by Jan Moy (1535–1550).

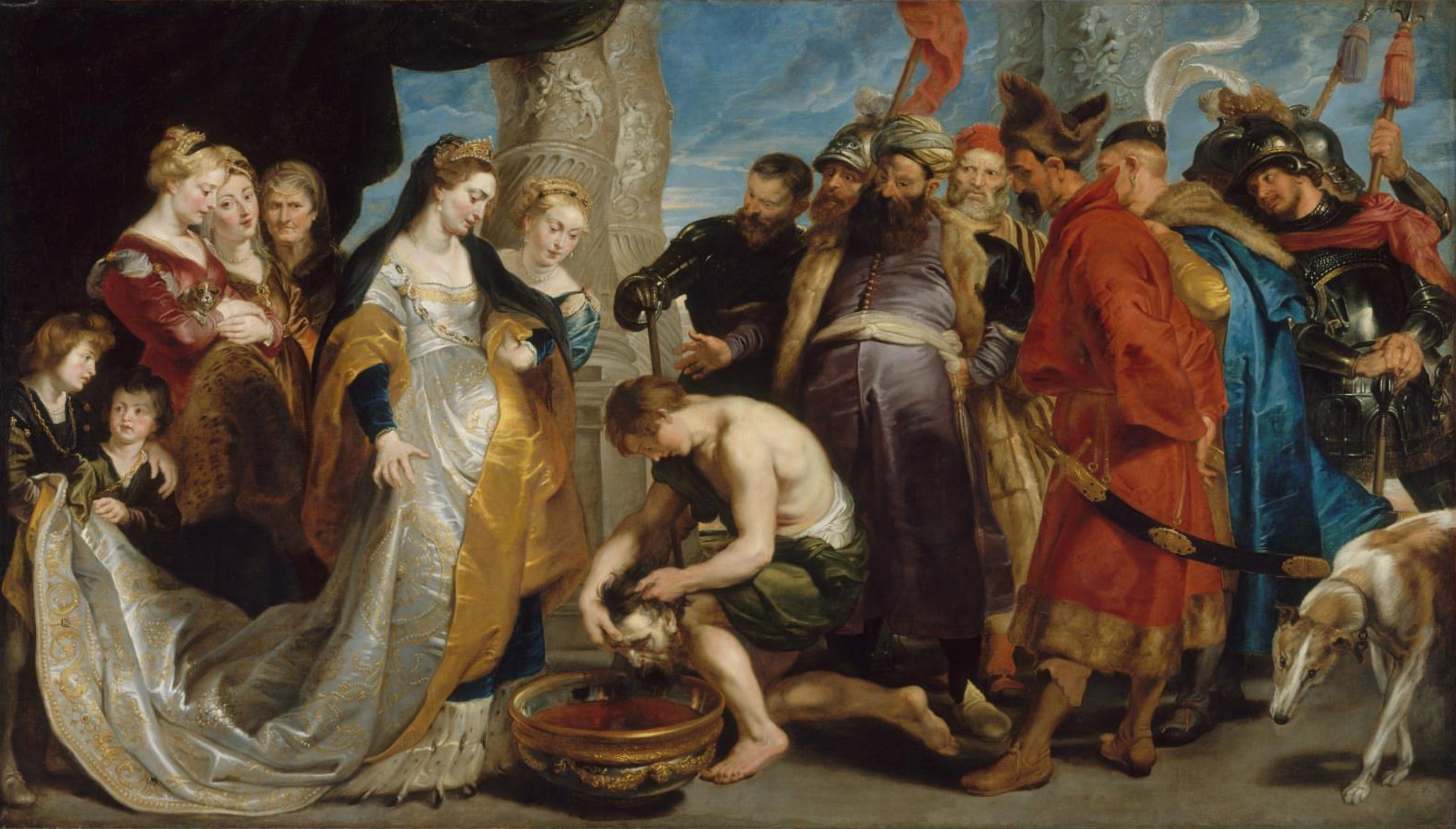
Tomyris Plunges the Head of the Dead Cyrus Into a Vessel of Blood by Rubens

Tomyris (/ˈtɒmɪrɪs/; Saka: *Taumuriyah; Ancient Greek: Τόμυρις, romanized: Tómuris; Latin: Tomyris) also called Thomyris, Tomris, or Tomiride, was a 6th-century BC queen of the Massagetae, a nomadic people who inhabited the Eurasian steppe. Tomyris is known only from the writings of the Greek historian Herodotus, according to whom she led her armies to defend against an attack by Cyrus the Great of the Achaemenid Empire, and defeated and killed him in 530 BC. She is not mentioned in the few other early sources covering the period, especially Ctesias.

Tomyris became a popular subject in European art and literature during the Renaissance. In visual art, she was typically depicted either receiving the head of Cyrus or placing it into a vessel filled with blood, a motif derived from one version of the accounts. This theme belonged to the 'Power of Women' tradition in Renaissance art, which celebrated women who triumphed over men in various ways.

== Name ==
The name Tomyris is the Latin form of the Ancient Greek name Tomuris (Τόμυρις), which is itself the Hellenisation of the Saka name *Taumuriyah, meaning "of family" derived from a cognate of the Avestan word taoxman (𐬙𐬀𐬊𐬑𐬨𐬀𐬥) and of the Old Persian word taumā (𐎫𐎢𐎶𐎠), meaning "seed," "germ," and "kinship."

== History ==
=== Background ===
Tomyris was the widow of the king of the Massagetae, whom she succeeded as the queen of the tribe after he died.

=== War with Persia ===
When the founder of the Persian Achaemenid Empire, Cyrus, asked for the hand of Tomyris with the intent of acquiring her kingdom through the marriage, she understood Cyrus's aims and rejected his proposal. On the advice of the Lydian Croesus, Cyrus responded to Tomyris's rejection by deciding to invade the Massagetae.

When Cyrus started building a bridge on the Araxes river with the intent of attacking the Massagetae, Tomyris advised him to remain satisfied with ruling his own kingdom and to allow her to rule her kingdom. Cyrus's initial assault was routed by the Massagetae, after which he set up a fancy banquet with large amounts of wine in the tents of his camp as an ambush and withdrew.

=== Death of Spargapises ===
The Massagetae, led by Tomyris's son and the commander of their army, Spargapises, who primarily used fermented mare's milk and cannabis as intoxicants like many Iron Age steppe nomads, and therefore were not used to drinking wine, became drunk and were easily defeated and slaughtered by Cyrus, thus destroying a third of the Massagetaean army. Spargapises had been captured by Cyrus, and, once he had become sober and understood his situation, he asked Cyrus to free him, and after Cyrus acquiesced to his pleas, Spargapises killed himself.

After Tomyris found out about the death of Spargapises, she sent Cyrus an angry message in which she called the wine, which had caused the destruction of her army and her son, a drug which made those who consumed it so mad that they spoke evil words, and demanded him to leave his land or else she would, swearing upon the Sun, "give him more blood than he could drink."

=== Death of Cyrus ===
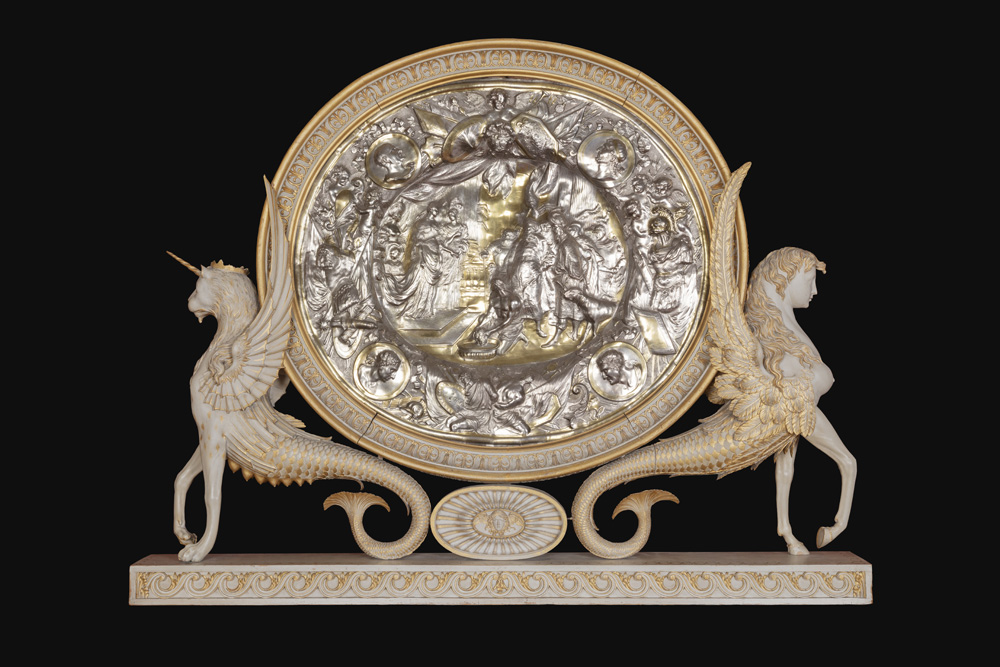
Silver dish showing Tomyris with Cyrus' corpse, Stourhead

In the account of Herodotus, Tomyris led the Massagetaean army into war against the Persian Achaemenid Empire, led by Cyrus. Tomyris defeated the Persians and destroyed most of their army. Cyrus was killed in the battle, and when Tomyris found his corpse, she severed his head and put it in a bag filled with blood, while telling him, "Drink your fill of blood!"

=== Aftermath ===
According to another version of the death of Cyrus recorded by Ctesias, Cyrus died in battle against the Derbices, who were either identical with the Massagetae or a Massagetaean sub-tribe: according to this version, he was mortally wounded by the Derbices and their Indian allies, after which Cyrus's ally, the king Amorges of the Amyrgians, intervened with his own army and helped the Persian soldiers defeat the Derbices, following which Cyrus endured for three days, during which he organised his empire and appointed Spitaces son of Sisamas as satrap over the Derbices, before finally dying.

Little is further known about Tomyris after the war with Cyrus. By around 520 BC and possibly earlier, her tribe was ruled by a king named Skuⁿxa, who rebelled against the Persian Empire until one of the successors of Cyrus, the Achaemenid king Darius I, carried out a campaign against the Sakas from 520 to 518 BC during which he conquered the Massagetae, captured Skuⁿxa, and replaced him with a ruler who was loyal to Achaemenid power.

== Legacy ==
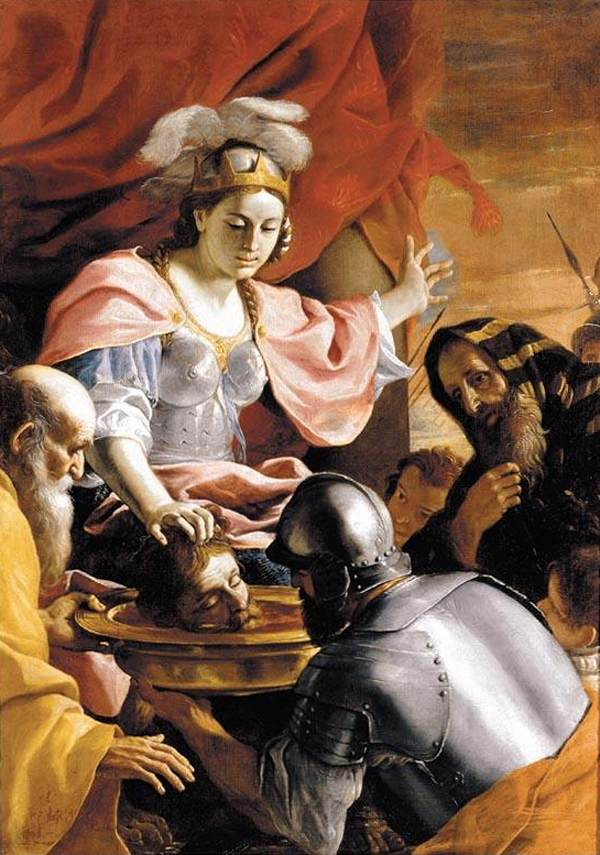
Mattia Preti, Tomyris Receiving the Head of Cyrus, 1670–72

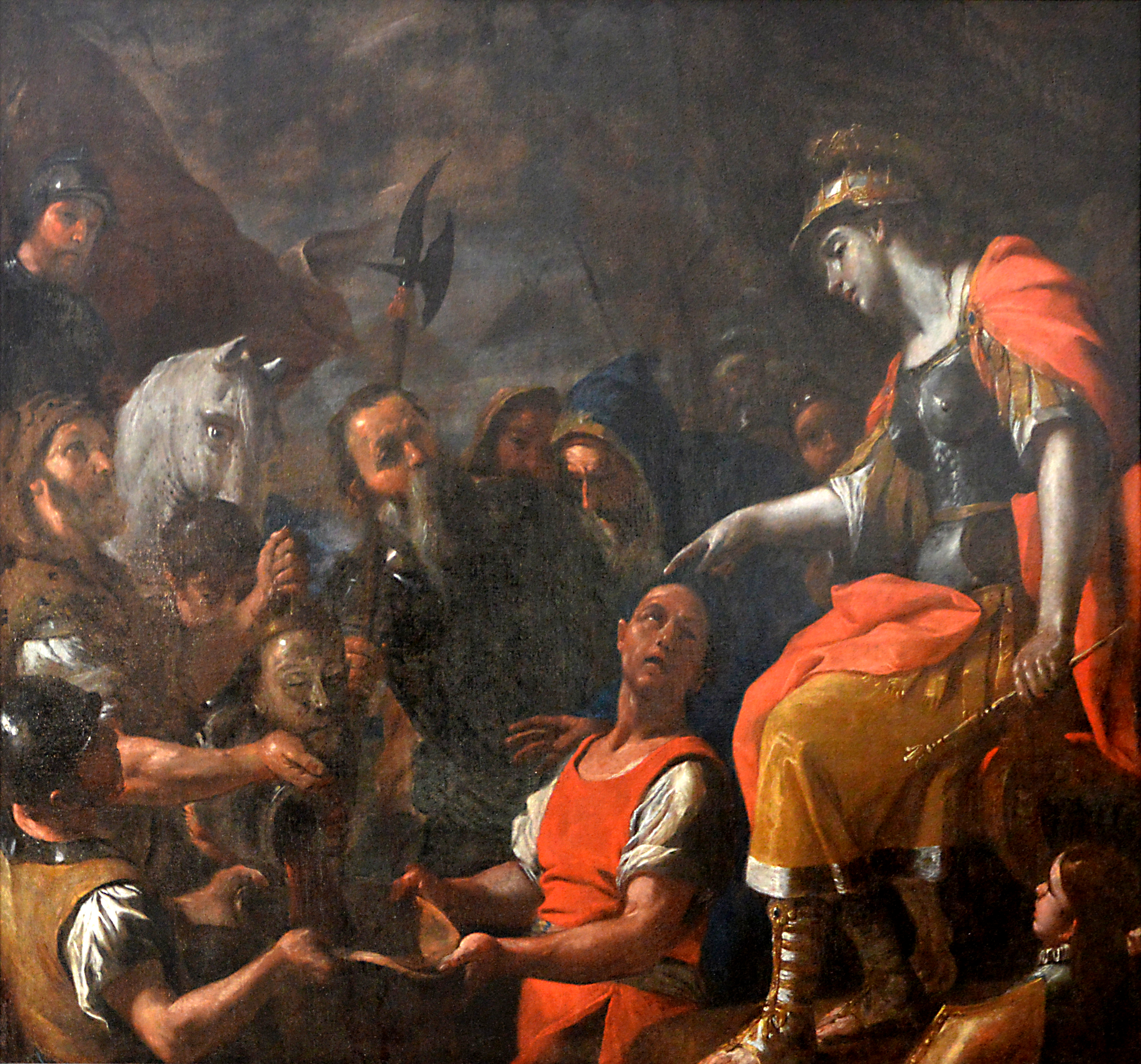
Queen Tomyris and the head of Cyrus, by Mattia Preti.

The history of Tomyris has been incorporated into the tradition of Western art; Rubens, Allegrini, Luca Ferrari, Mattia Preti, Gustave Moreau and the sculptor Severo Calzetta da Ravenna are among the many artists who have portrayed events in the life of Tomyris and her defeat of Cyrus and his armies.

Eustache Deschamps added Tomyris to his poetry as one of the nine Female Worthies in the late 14th century.

In Shakespeare's earliest play King Henry VI (Part I), the Countess of Auvergne, while awaiting Lord Talbot's arrival, references Tomyris (Act II, Sc. iii).

Shakespeare's reference to Tomyris as 'Queen of the Scythians', rather than the usual Greek designation 'Queen of the Massagetae', points to two possible likely sources, Marcus Junianus Justinus' "Abridged Trogus Pompeius" in Latin, or Arthur Golding's translation (1564).

In 1707 the opera Thomyris, Queen of Scythia was first staged in London.

The name "Tomyris" also has been adopted into zoological taxonomy, for the Tomyris species group of Central American moths and the Tamyris genus of skipper butterflies.

590 Tomyris is the name given to one of the minor planets.

Kazakhstan has adopted Tomyris as its national heroine and issues coins in her honour.

== In popular culture ==
- Toʻmarisning Koʻzlari (The Eyes of Tomyris) is a 1984 book of poems and stories by Uzbek author Khurshid Davron.
- Toʻmarisning Aytgani (The Sayings of Tomyris) is a 1996 book of poetry by Uzbek poet Halima Xudoyberdiyeva.
- The Kazakhstani film studio "Kazakhfilm" released the film Томирис (Tomyris) in late 2019. She is portrayed by Almira Tursyn.
- Tomyris leads the Scythian civilization in the 2016 4X video game Civilization VI developed by Firaxis Games.
- Washington D.C.–based, female-fronted, heavy metal band A Sound of Thunder, features a song titled "Tomyris," based on the historical figure, on their sixth full-length album It Was Metal released in 2018.

== See also ==
- Amage
- Zarinaea
- Amazons

== Sources ==
- Dandamayev, M. A. (1994). "Media and Achaemenid Iran". In Dani, Ahmad Hasan; Harmatta, János; Puri, Baij Nath; Etemadi, G. F.; Bosworth, Clifford Edmund (eds.). The Development of Sedentary and Nomadic Civilizations: 700 B.C. to A.D. 250. History of Civilizations of Central Asia. Vol. 2. Paris, France: UNESCO. pp. 35–64. ISBN 978-9-231-02846-5.
- Francfort, Henri-Paul (1988). "Central Asia and Eastern Iran". In Boardman, John; Hammond, N. G. L.; Lewis, D. M.; Ostwald, M. (eds.). The Cambridge Ancient History. Vol. 4. Cambridge, United Kingdom: Cambridge University Press. ISBN 978-0-521-22804-6.
- Mayor, Adrienne (2014). The Amazons: Lives and Legends of Warrior Women across the Ancient World. Princeton, United States: Princeton University Press. pp. 143–144. ISBN 978-0-691-14720-8.
- Mayor, Adrienne (2017). "AMAZONS IN THE IRANIAN WORLD". Encyclopædia Iranica.
- Rollinger, Robert (2003). "HERODOTUS iv. CYRUS ACCORDING TO HERODOTUS". Encyclopædia Iranica.
- Schmitt, Rüdiger (2018). "MASSAGETAE". Encyclopædia Iranica.

Tomyris
Regnal titles
Preceded by unnamed husband	Queen of the Massagetae unknown – c. 520s BCE	Succeeded by Skunkha (?)
