= Spargapises =

6th-century BC Massagetae general and son of queen Tomyris

- Died: 530 BCE
- Saka: Spargapis
- Mother: Tomyris
- Religion: Scythian religion
- Occupation: Army general

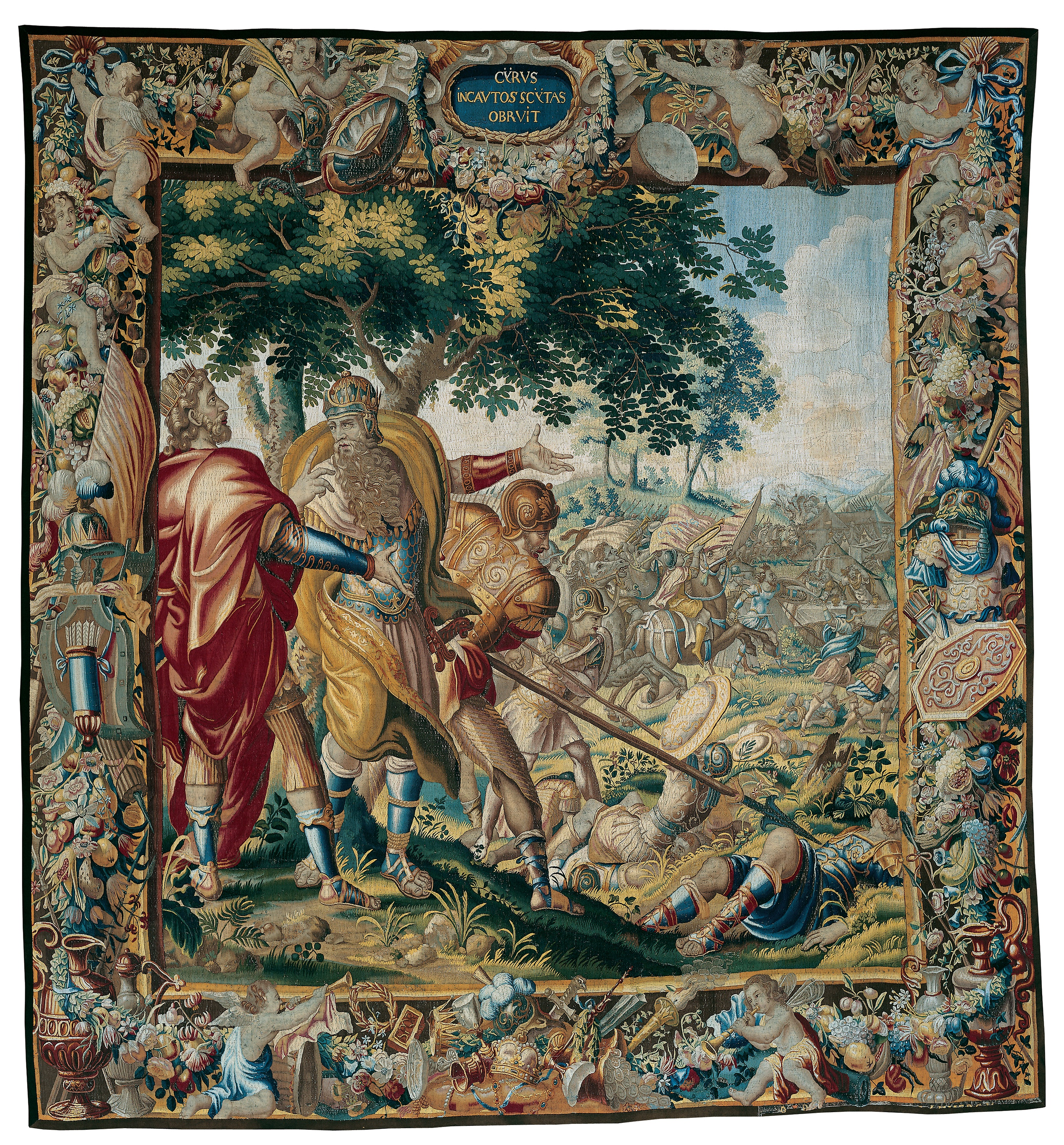
“Cyrus Defeats Spargapises,” from The Story of Cyrus, Adapted from designs by Michiel Coxie (1499–1592), Woven at the workshop of Albert Auwercx (1629–1709)

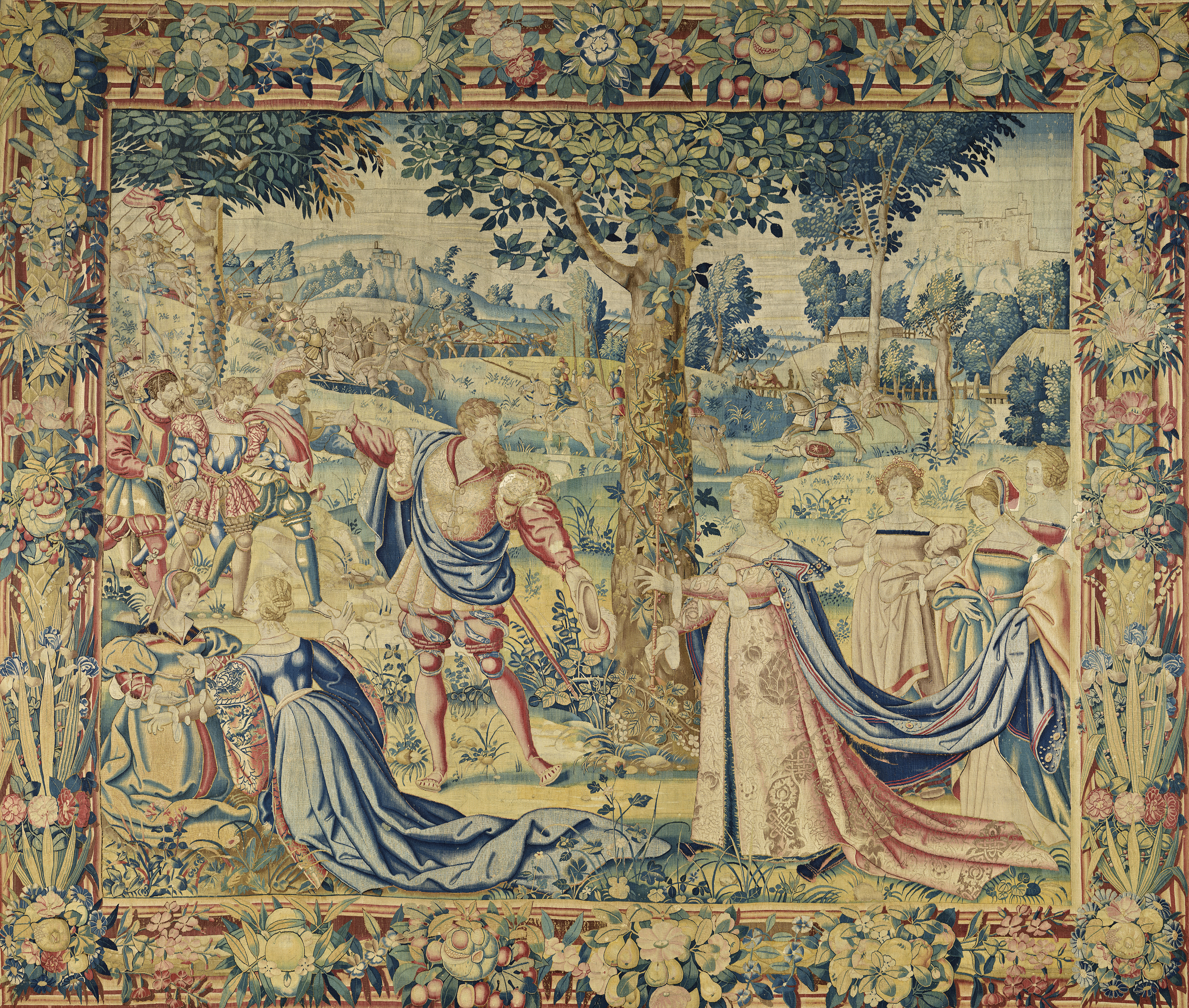
Queen Tomyris learns that her son Spargapises has been taken alive by Cyrus, by Jan Moy (1535-1550).

Spargapises (Saka: *Spargapis; Ancient Greek: Σπαργαπισης, romanized: Spargapisēs; Latin: Spargapises; d. 530 BCE) was the son of queen Tomyris of the Massagetai.Spargapises is known only from the writings of the Greek historian Herodotus He is not mentioned in the few other early sources covering the period, especially Ctesias.

== Name ==
Spargapisēs (Σπαργαπισης) is a Hellenisation of the Saka name *Spargapis, and is composed of the terms *sparga-, meaning “scion” and “descendant,” and *pis-, meaning “decoration” and “adornment.”

The name of Spargapis and those of the Agathyrsian and Scythian kings both named Spargapaiϑah are variants of the same name, and both forms, Spargapis and Spargapaiϑah, are cognates of the Avestan name Sparəγa-paēsa (𐬯𐬞𐬀𐬭𐬆𐬖𐬀⸱𐬞𐬀𐬉𐬯𐬀).

== Life ==
=== Background ===
Spargapises was the son of the king of the Massagetai and of his queen, Tomyris. After the death of the king, the widowed Tomyris succeeded him as the ruler of the tribe, and, once he had become old enough, Spargapises became the leader of the army of the Massagetai.

=== War against Persia ===
When the founder of the Persian Achaemenid Empire, Cyrus II, asked for the hand of Tomyris with the intent of acquiring her kingdom through the marriage, she understood Cyrus's aims and rejected his proposal. On the advice of the former Lydian king Croesus, Cyrus responded to Tomyris's rejection by deciding to invade the Massagetai.

=== Death ===
Cyrus's initial assault against the Massagetai was routed by them, after which he set up a fancy banquet with large amounts of wine in the tents of his camp as an ambush and withdrew. The Massagetai, led by Spargapises, who primarily used fermented mare's milk and cannabis as intoxicants like all Iron Age steppe nomads, and therefore were not used to drinking wine, became drunk and were easily defeated and slaughtered by Cyrus, thus destroying a third of the Massagetai army. Spargapises had been captured by Cyrus, and, once he had become sober and understood his situation, he asked Cyrus to free him, and after Cyrus acquiesced to his pleas, he killed himself.

=== Aftermath ===
After Tomyris found out about the death of Spargapises, she sent Cyrus an angry message in which she called the wine, which had caused the destruction of her army and her son, a drug which made those who consumed it so mad that they spoke evil words, and demanded him to leave his land or else she would, swearing upon the Sun, "give him more blood than he could drink."

Tomyris herself led the Massagetai army into war, and, during the next battle opposing the Massagetai to the forces of Cyrus, Tomyris defeated the Persians and destroyed most of their army. Cyrus himself was killed in the battle, and Tomyris found his corpse, severed his head and shoved it in a bag filled with blood while telling Cyrus, "Drink your fill of blood!"

== Sources ==
- Gera, Deborah Levine (2018). Warrior Women: The Anonymous Tractatus De Mulieribus. Leiden, Netherlands; New York City, United States: Brill. pp. 187–199. ISBN 978-9-004-32988-1.
- Hinz, Walther [in German] (1975). Altiranisches Sprachgut der Nebenüberleiferung [Old Iranian Language from Collateral Sources] (in German). Wiesbaden, Germany: Harrassowitz. ISBN 3-447-01703-1.
- Kullanda, Sergei [in Russian] (2014). "External relations of Scythian". Journal of Language Relationship. 11 (1). Piscataway, United States: Gorgias Press: 81–90. doi:10.31826/jlr-2014-110110.
- Mayor, Adrienne (2014). The Amazons: Lives and Legends of Warrior Women across the Ancient World. Princeton, United States: Princeton University Press. pp. 143–144. ISBN 978-0-691-14720-8.
- Mayor, Adrienne (2017). "AMAZONS IN THE IRANIAN WORLD". Encyclopædia Iranica.
- Rollinger, Robert (2003). "HERODOTUS iv. CYRUS ACCORDING TO HERODOTUS". Encyclopædia Iranica.
- Schmitt, Rüdiger (2003). "Die skythischen Personennamen bei Herodot" [Scythian Personal Names in Herodotus] (PDF). Annali dell'Università degli Studi di Napoli l'Orientale (in German). 63: 1–31.
- Schmitt, Rüdiger (2011). Iranisches Personennamenbuch [Book of Iranian Personal Names] (in German). Vol. 5.5a. Verlag der Österreichischen Akademie der Wissenschaften. pp. 341–342. ISBN 978-3-700-17142-3.
