= Zarinaea =

Queen of the Saka or Dahae tribes

Zarinaia
- Predecessor: Cydraeus
- Born: 7th century BCE
- Died: 6th century BCE
- Spouses: Cydraeus; Marmares; Stryngaeus (?)
- Religion: Scythian religion

Zarinaea also referred to as Zarinaia or Zarinsea (Saka: *Zarinayā; Ancient Greek: Ζαριναια, romanized: Zarinaiā; Latin: Zarinaea) or Zarina was a queen of one of the Saka tribes or of the Dahae of the 7th century BCE who is mentioned by the Greek author Diodorus Siculus.

== Name ==
The name Zarinaea is the Latin form of the Greek name Zarinaiā (Ζαριναιᾱ), which is itself the Hellenisation of the Saka name *Zarinayā, meaning "the golden one." *Zarinayā is a hypocoristic name formed out of the Old Iranian term *zari-, meaning "golden," and the suffix *-aya-.

== Historicity ==
According to the Iranologist Rüdiger Schmitt, Zarinaia was a legendary figure, while the historian Adrienne Mayor suggests that she was a historical figure.

== Life ==
Zarinaia was the sister and wife of the Saka king Cydraeus, but after he died while she was still young, she became the ruling queen of her tribe, among whom the women would fight alongside the men. Zarinaia was a strikingly beautiful woman whose beauty surpassed that of other Saka women, and she distinguished herself both as a warrior and a ruler, being considered a hero for defeating enemy tribes, and she reputedly founded multiple cities.

After Cydraeus's death, Zarinaia had married the Parthian king Marmares, and at one point the Parthians revolted against the Medes and entrusted their country and their capital city to Zarinaia's people, after which a war broke out between the latter, led by Zarinaia herself, and the Medes.

Various accounts of the war of the Sakas against the Medes exist: according to one version Zarinaia was knocked off her horse by Stryngaeus, the son-in-law of the Median king Cyaxares (whom Diodorus named Astibaras in his account), who, struck by her beauty, allowed her to remount her horse and flee unharmed; according to another version, Zarinaia was wounded and captured by Stryngaeus, who listened to her pleas and spared her life.

When Marmares later captured Stryngaeus, Zarinaia pleaded to her husband for his release because he had saved her life. And when Marmares was about to execute Stryngaeus, Zarinaia instead killed Marmares, freed Stryngaeus and the Median prisoners of war, and handed her land to the Medes. At the end of this war, the Parthians accepted Median rule, and peace was made between the Medes and the Saka.

Stryngaeus himself had fallen in love with Zarinaia, and he visited her in the city Rhoxanake, where she greeted him, kissed him publicly, and rode in his chariot while chatting happily.

When Stryngaeus told Zarinaia of his feelings, she gently rejected him and chastised him for his infidelity towards his own wife and concubines, after which Stryngaeus wrote a farewell letter to Zarinaia and decided to commit suicide. However the records beyond Stryngaeus's decision to kill himself have not been preserved, leaving his fate unknown.

Thanks to Zarinaia's heroic achievements and because she had kept her people happy, after her death she was honoured by them with a huge 600 feet high pyramidal mound-tomb at the top of which was a golden statue.

== Legacy ==
Several versions of the name, including Zarina, Zareena, or Zareen, are common in South Asia, Western Asia, and Eastern Europe.

The name of Zarinaia has also been artificially revived among Ossetians in the form Зӕринӕ (Zærinæ).

== See also ==
- Massagetae, another Saka tribe which had contacts with the Medes

== Sources ==
- Diakonoff, I. M. (1985). "Media". In Gershevitch, Ilya (ed.). The Cambridge History of Iran. Vol. 2. Cambridge: Cambridge University Press. pp. 36–148. ISBN 978-0-521-20091-2.
- Mayor, Adrienne (2014). The Amazons: Lives and Legends of Warrior Women across the Ancient World. Princeton, United States: Princeton University Press. pp. 379–381. ISBN 978-0-691-14720-8.
- Schmitt, Rüdiger (2000). "ZARINAIA". Encyclopædia Iranica.
