= Apasiacans =

Ancient Scythian tribe

The Apasiacae or Apasiacans (Greek: Ἀπασιάχαι) were a nomadic tribe belonging to the Scythian Massagetae. They are known only from Greek and Roman sources, and are unattested in surviving Iranian texts. Ancient authors place them in Central Asia, between the Oxus and the Tanais, generally understood in this context as the Jaxartes.

== Etymology ==
The etymology of the tribal name remains uncertain. Earlier proposals deriving the name from the Iranian Āpa-sakā (“Water Sakas”) and Āpa-šyā-ka- have been rejected by modern scholarship on linguistic grounds.

== Classification ==
Stephanus of Byzantium described the Apasiacans as a Massagetae people. Various scholars have proposed identifying them with the Paesici, Pestici, or Pasikai mentioned by Pliny the Elder, Pomponius Mela, and Ptolemy, respectively, but these identifications remain conjectural.

== History ==
Polybius describes the Apasiacans in connection with the campaigns of Antiochus III, preserving traditions about how they crossed the Oxus into Hyrcania with their horses. He records two explanations: one involving difficult crossings through steep river valleys, and another describing subterranean channels beneath the river that allegedly allowed mounted passage. Modern scholars generally regard the latter account as legendary.

According to Strabo, after the Seleucid campaign against Parthia in the late 3rd century BC, Arsaces I took refuge amongst the Apasiacans, following the Seleucid counteroffensive. Some scholars have suggested that the Attasioi mentioned in connection with Spitamenes’ resistance to Alexander the Great represent the same people under a corrupted name, although this identification remains uncertain.

== See also ==
- Massagetae

== Sources ==
- Potts, Daniel T. (2014). Nomadism in Iran: From Antiquity to the Modern Era. New York: Oxford University Press. ISBN 978-0199330799.
- Schmitt, R. (1986). "3". Apasiacae. Encyclopædia Iranica. New York City, United States: Encyclopædia Iranica Foundation; Brill Publishers. Archived from the original on 23 June 2022.
