= Skunkha =

Saka king (fl. 519 BCE)

Skuⁿxa
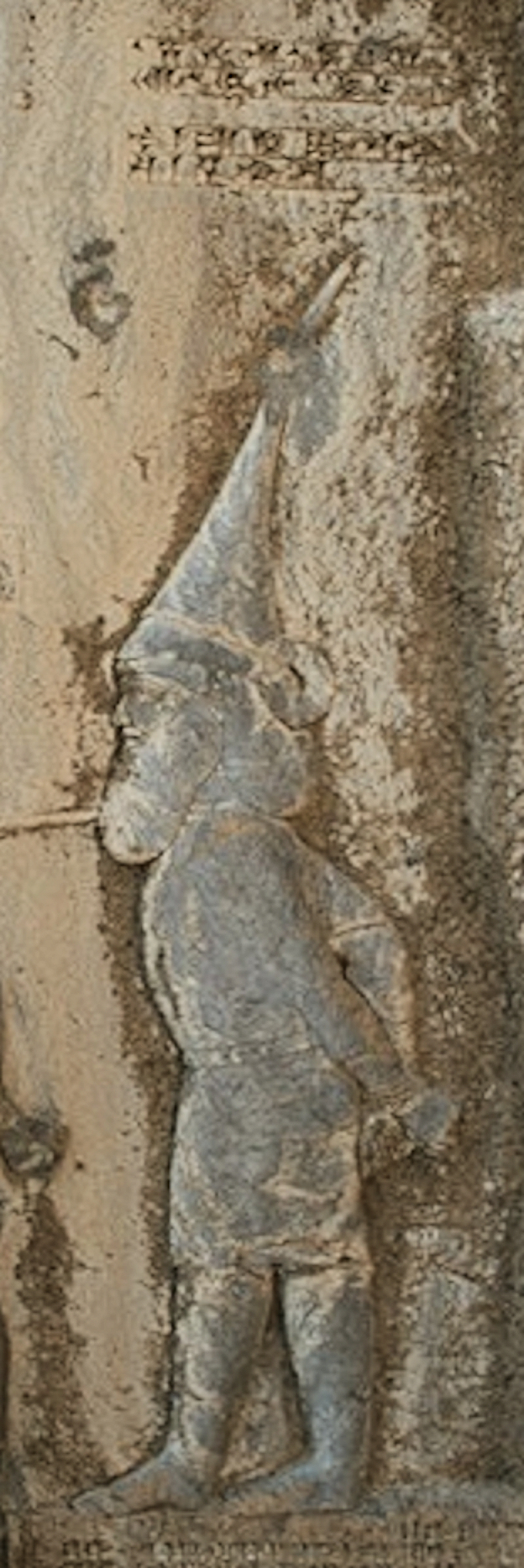
- Behistun relief of Skuⁿxa; Label: iyam Skuⁿxa hya Saka ("This Skuⁿxa, he is a Saka")

King of the Sakā tigraxaudā
- Reign: mid 6th century BCE–518 BCE
- Predecessor: Tomyris (?)
- Successor: unknown
- Saka: Skuⁿxa
- Religion: Scythian religion

Skunkha (Old Persian: 𐎿𐎤𐎢𐎧 Skuⁿxa), was king of the Sakā tigraxaudā ("Saka who wear pointed caps"), a group of the Saka, in the 6th century BC.

== Name ==
The name Skuⁿxa might be related to the Ossetian term meaning "distinguishing oneself," and attested as sk_{o}yxyn (скуыхын) in the Iron dialect, and as æsk’wænxun (ӕскъуӕнхун) in the Digor dialect.

== Capture ==
In 519 BC, Darius I of the Persian Achaemenid Empire attacked the Saka tribe and captured their king. His capture is depicted in the relief sculpture of Behistun Inscription, last in a row of defeated "lying kings". After his defeat, Darius replaced him with the chief of another tribe.

Skuⁿxa
Regnal titles
Preceded by Tomyris (?)	King of the Sakā tigraxaudā mid 6th century BCE–518 BCE	Unknown
