= 590 Tomyris =

Minor planet

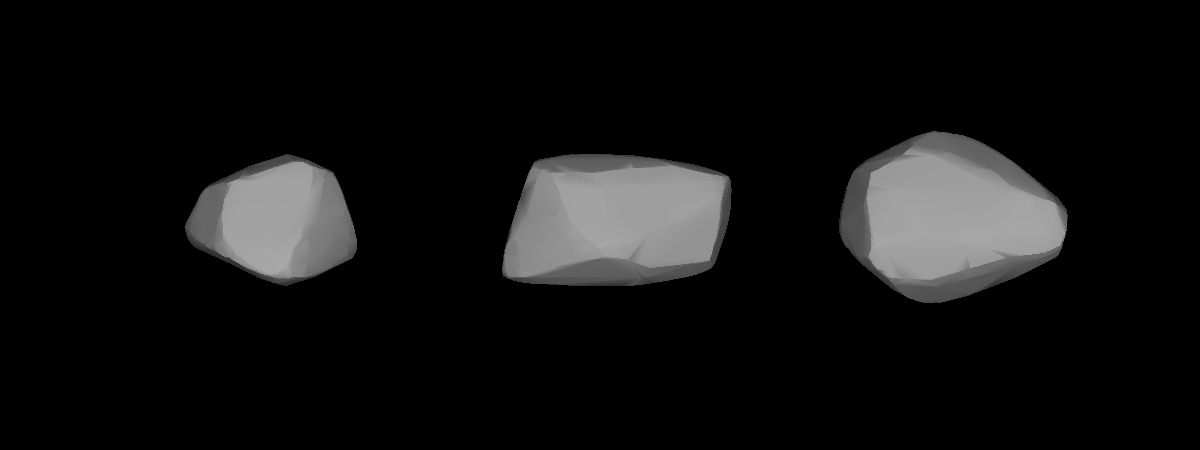
- A three-dimensional model of 590 Tomyris based on its light curve

Discovery
- Discovered by: Max Wolf
- Discovery site: Heidelberg
- Discovery date: 4 March 1906

Designations
- Pronunciation: /ˈtɒmɪrɪs/
- Alternative designations: 1906 TO

Orbital characteristics
- Epoch 31 July 2016 (JD 2457600.5)
- Uncertainty parameter 0
- Observation arc: 110.12 yr (40221 d)
- Aphelion: 3.2395 AU (484.62 Gm)
- Perihelion: 2.7564 AU (412.35 Gm)
- Semi-major axis: 2.9979 AU (448.48 Gm)
- Eccentricity: 0.080570
- Orbital period (sidereal): 5.19 yr (1896.0 d)
- Mean anomaly: 166.534°
- Mean motion: 0° 11^{m} 23.532^{s} / day
- Inclination: 11.174°
- Longitude of ascending node: 106.157°
- Argument of perihelion: 339.791°

Physical characteristics
- Mean radius: 19.935±0.7 km
- Synodic rotation period: 5.562 h (0.2318 d)
- Geometric albedo: 0.1218±0.009
- Absolute magnitude (H): 9.90

590 Tomyris is a minor planet orbiting the Sun. Its name derives from the Massagetean (ancient Eastern Iranian) ruler Tomyris, and may have been inspired by the asteroid's provisional designation 1906 TO.
