= Zarini =

Zarini is an Italian or Iranian (Persian) surname, and may refer to:

- Alexandra Zarini (1985), a children's rights activist, an heiress of the Gucci family;
- Hamzeh Zarini (1985), an Iranian volleyball player;
- Hussain Zarrini (1930), an Iranian weightlifter.

== See also ==
- Zarina
