= Massagetae =

Ancient Iranian nomadic confederation in Central Asia

Sakā tigraxauda Massagetae
- c. 8th century BCE–c. 3rd century BCE
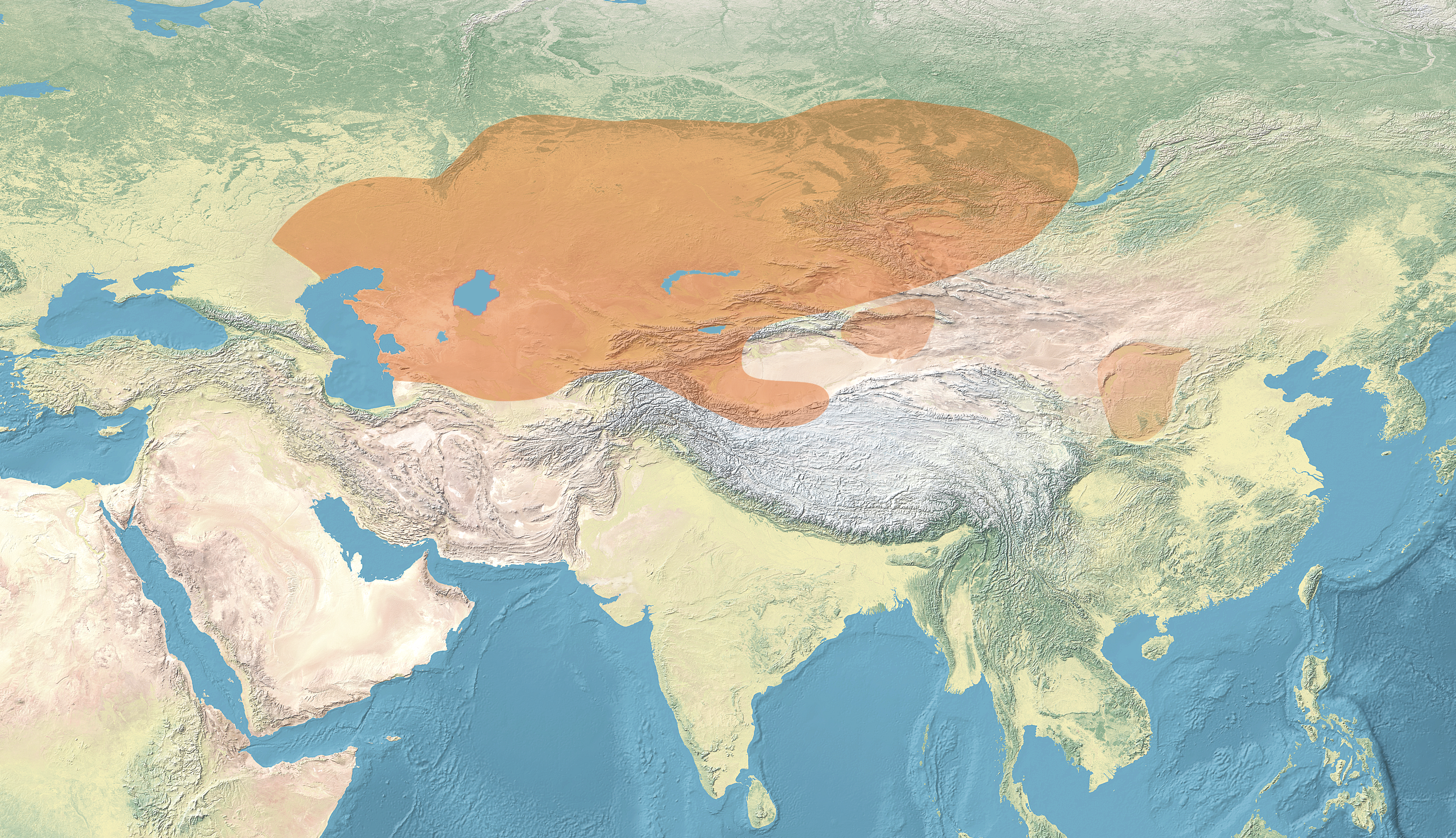
- Location of the Massagetae within the Saka realm ( ), and contemporary polities c. -325
- Common languages: Saka language
- Religion: Scythian religion
- Demonyms: Sakā tigraxaudā Orthocorybantes; Massagetae
- Government: Monarchy
- King or Queen
  - c. 530 BCE: Tomyris
  - c. 520 BCE: Skuⁿxa
- Historical era: Iron Age Scythian cultures
  - Established: c. 8th century BCE
  - Disestablished: c. 3rd century BCE

The Massagetae or Massageteans, also known as Sakā Tigraxaudā or Orthocorybantians, were an ancient Eastern Iranian Saka people who inhabited the steppes of Central Asia and were part of the wider Scythian cultures. The Massagetae rose to power between the 8th and 7th centuries BC, expelling the Scythians out of Central Asia and into the Caucasian and Pontic Steppes, an event which was to have wide-reaching consequences. The Massagetae are most famous for their queen Tomyris and her alleged defeat and killing of Cyrus the Great, the founder of the Persian Achaemenid Empire.

The Massagetae declined after the 3rd century BC, after which they merged with some other tribes to form the Alans, a people who belonged to the larger Sarmatian tribal confederation, and who moved westwards into the Caucasian and European steppes, where they participated in the events of the Migration Period.

== Names ==
=== Massagetae ===
The name Massagetae is the Latin form of Ancient Greek: Μασσαγέται Massagétai.

The Iranologist Rüdiger Schmitt notes that although the original name of the Massagetae is unattested, it appears that the most plausible etymon is the Iranian *Masyaka-tā. *Masyaka-tā is the plural form, containing the East Iranian suffix *-tā, which is reflected in Greek -tai. The singular form is *Masi̯a-ka- and is composed of the Iranian *-ka- and *masi̯a-, meaning "fish," derived from Young Avestan masiia- (𐬨𐬀𐬯𐬌𐬌𐬀; cognate with Vedic mátsya-). The name literally means "concerned with fish," or "fisherman." This corresponds with the remark made by the ancient Greek historian Herodotus (1.216.3) that "they live on their livestock and fish." Schmitt notes that objections to this reasoning, based on the assumption that, instead of masi̯a-, a derivation from Iranian *kapa- "fish" (compare Ossetian кӕф (kæf)) would be expected, is "not decisive." Schmitt states that any other interpretations on the origin of the original Iranian name of the Massagetae are "linguistically unacceptable."

The Iranologist János Harmatta has, however, criticised the proposal of Massagetai's derivation from masyaka-ta, meaning "fish-eating (men)," as being semantically and phonologically unacceptable, and instead has suggested that the name might be derived from an early Bactrian language name Maššagatā, from an earlier Mašyagatā related to the Young Avestan terms maṣ̌a- (𐬨𐬀𐬴𐬀), maṣ̌iia- (𐬨𐬀𐬴𐬌𐬌𐬀), maṣ̌iiāka- (𐬨𐬀𐬴𐬌𐬌𐬁𐬐𐬀), meaning "men," with the ending of the name being derived from the East Iranian suffix *-tā or from the collective formative syllable from which the suffix evolved. According to Harmatta's hypothesis, the Bactrian name Maššagatā would have corresponded to the name Dahā, meaning "men," used by the Massagetae for themselves.

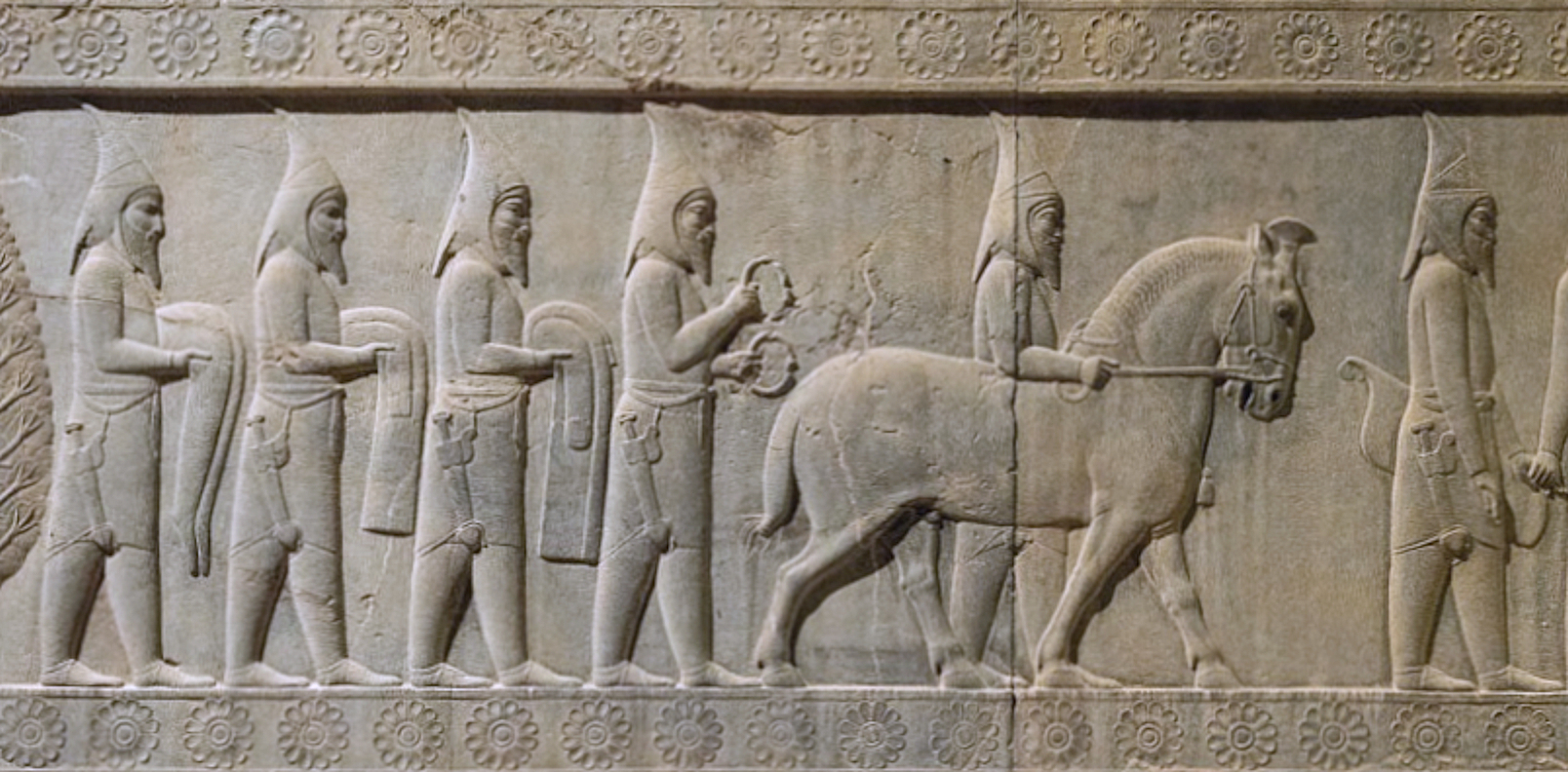
A delegation of Tigraxaudā/Orthocorybantians paying tribute on the Apadana relief, together with all the other peoples of the empire.

=== Sakā tigraxaudā ===
The Old Persian name Sakā tigraxaudā (𐎿𐎣𐎠 𐏐 𐎫𐎡𐎥𐎼𐎧𐎢𐎭𐎠) meant "Saka who wear pointed hats", with the descriptive tigraxaudā (𐎫𐎡𐎥𐎼𐎧𐎢𐎭), meaning "wearer of pointed hats," is composed of the terms tigraʰ (𐎫𐎡𐎥𐎼), "pointed," and xauda- (𐎧𐎢𐎭𐎠), "cap.", and is believed to refer to the Massagetae. This name was a reference to the Phrygian cap worn by the ancient Iranian peoples, of which the Sakā tigraxaudā wore an unusually tall and pointed form.

==== Orthocorybantes ====
The name Orthocorybantians given to the Massagetai/Sakā tigraxaudā is derived from the Latin name Orthocorybantes, which is derived from the Ancient Greek: Ορθοκορυβαντες, romanized: Orthokorubantes, which is itself the literal translation of the Old Persian name tigraxaudā (𐎫𐎡𐎥𐎼𐎧𐎢𐎭), meaning "wearer of pointed hats.",

=== Apasiacae ===
The proposed etymologies for the Massagataean sub-tribe of the Apasiacae, whose name is not attested in ancient Iranian records, include *Āpasakā, meaning "Water-Sakas," and *Āpašyāka, meaning "rejoicing at water," which have so far not been conclusive.

- The Sanskrit element āpa means "water" and saka means Scythian appears in several Indo-Iranian religious and legal contexts, including terms associated with oaths, rivers, and cosmic order. The name Āpa-Śaka has also been identified in Mahabharata descriptions of sakas. According to the Mahābhārata Bhīṣma Parva 6.10–12 (geographical descriptions of Śākadvīpa and river-defined peoples) and Mahābhārata Sabha parva 2.29–32 (Nakula's western campaign mentioning Śakas in watery or coastal regions) apa sakas are identified. Greek authors such as Strabo and Ptolemy place the Apasiacae in regions dominated by major river systems of Central Asia, which aligns geographically with Indian epic Mahabharata descriptions of Śaka groups associated with water-defined territories.

== Identification ==
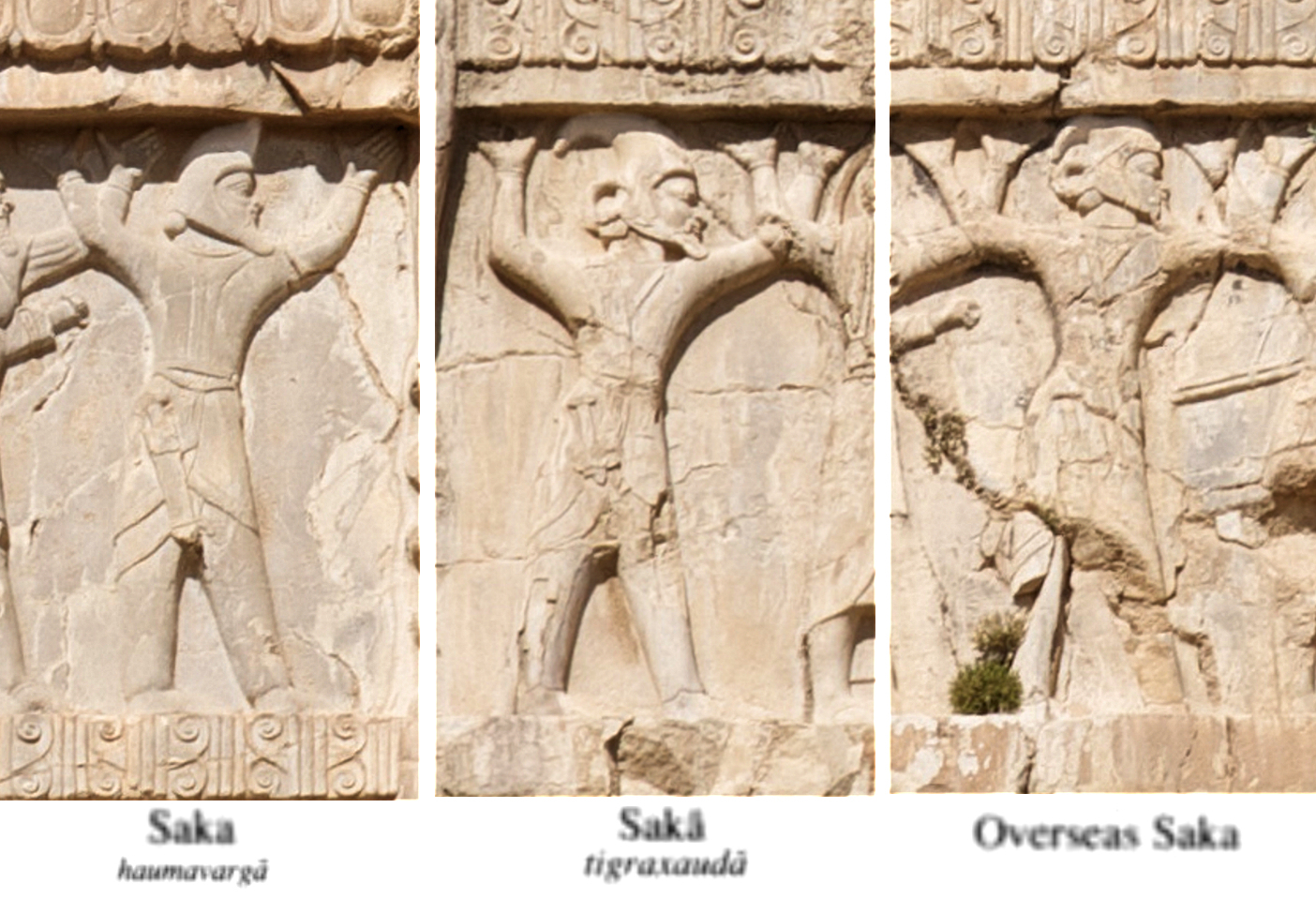
Scythian-Saka warriors depicted on the tomb of Xerxes I.

=== Sakā tigraxaudā ===
The Iranologist János Harmatta has identified the Massagetae as being the same as the people named Sakā tigraxaudā ("Sakā who wear pointed caps") by the Persians and Orthocorybantes by Graeco-Romans. Harmatta's identification is based on the mention of the Sakā tigraxaudā as living between the Amu Darya and Syr Darya rivers, where Arrian also located the Massagetae.

The scholar Marek Jan Olbrycht has also identified the Massagetae with the Sakā tigraxaudā.

=== Dahā ===
János Harmatta has also identified the Massagetai/Sakā tigraxaudā with the Dahā, with this identification being based on the location of the former between the Amu Darya and Syr Darya rivers, where Arrian also located the Dahae. The scholars A. Abetekov and H. Yusupov have also suggested that the Dahā were a constituent tribe of the Massagetae. C. J. Brunner suggested that the Daha were either neighbours of the Saka Tigraxauda or that both groups were part of the same people.

The scholar Y. A. Zadneprovskiy has instead suggested that the Dahae were descendants of the Massagetae.

Marek Jan Olbrycht considers the Dahā as being a separate group from the Saka, and therefore as not identical with the Massagetae/Sakā tigraxaudā.

=== Sꜣg pḥ Sk tꜣ ===
Based on Strabo's remark that the Massagetae lived partly on the plains, the mountains, the marshes, and the islands in the country irrigated by the Araxes river, the Iranologist Rüdiger Schmitt has also suggestive a tentative connection with the Sꜣg pḥ Sk tꜣ (Ancient Egyptian 𓐠𓎼𓄖𓋴𓎝𓎡𓇿𓈉), the "Saka of the Marshes, Saka of the Land," mentioned in the Suez Inscriptions of Darius the Great.

=== Sub-tribes ===
The Massagetae were composed of multiple sub-tribes, including:

- the Apasiacae (Ancient Greek: Απασιακαι, romanized: Apasiakai)
- the Augasii (Ancient Greek: Αυγασιοι, romanized: Augasioi)
- the Derbices (Ancient Greek: Δερβικες, romanized: Derbikes; Δερβικκαι, romanized: Derbikkai; Δερβεκιοι, romanized: Derbekioi)
- The Sanskrit element āpa means "water" and saka means Scythian appears in several Indo-Iranian religious and legal contexts, including terms associated with oaths, rivers, and cosmic order. The name Āpa-Śaka has also been identified in Mahabharata descriptions of sakas.

== Location ==
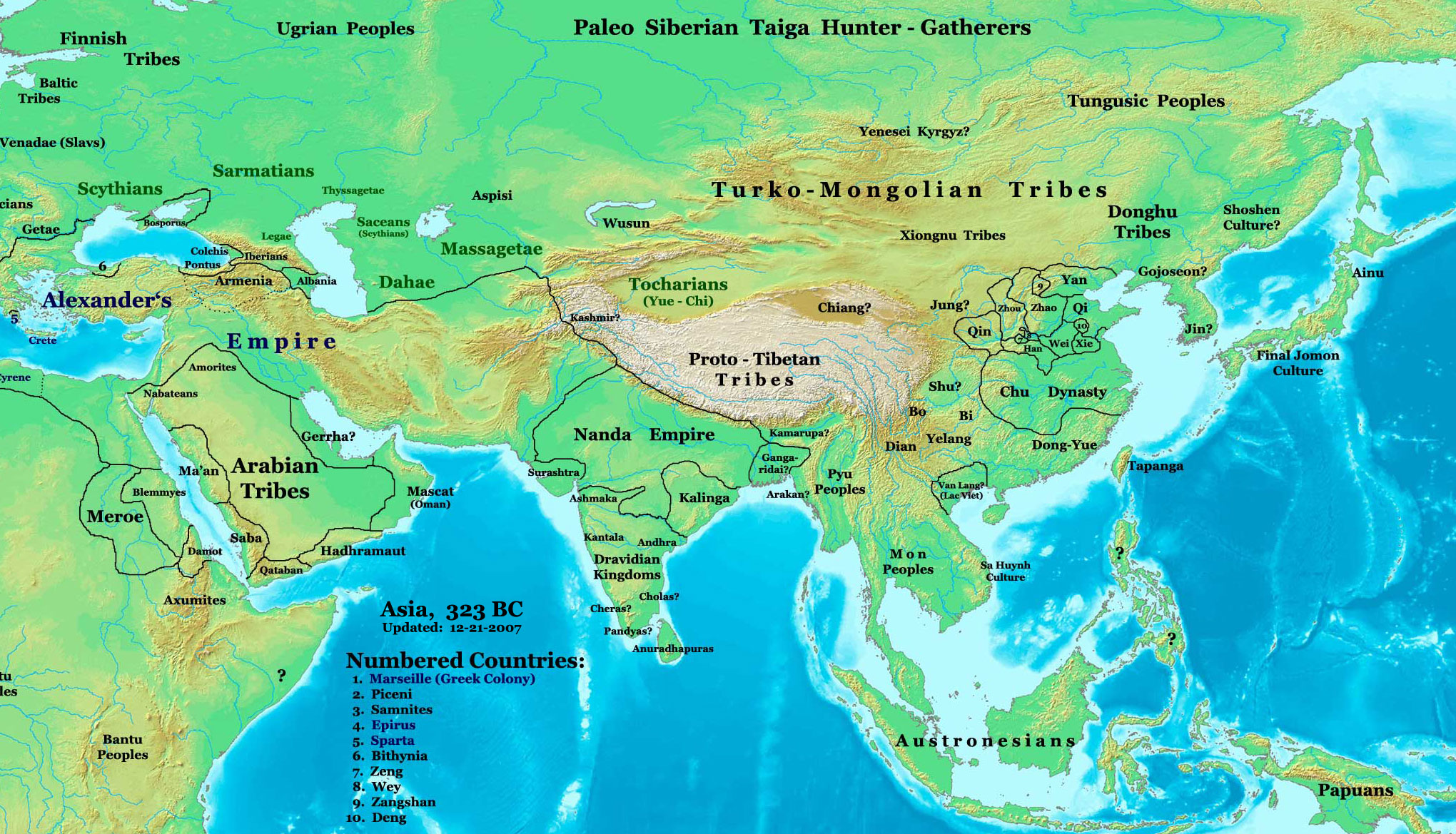
Asia in 323 BC, showing the Massagetae located in Central Asia.

The Massagetae lived in the Caspian Steppe as well as in the lowlands of Central Asia located to the east of the Caspian Sea and the south-east of the Aral Sea, more precisely across the large area stretching from the lands around the Amu Darya and Zarafshan rivers up to the steppes and the deserts to the north of the Khorasan mountain corridor, that is in the region including the Kyzylkum and Karakum deserts and the Ustyurt Plateau, especially the area between the Oxus and Iaxartes rivers and around Chorasmia. The territory of the Massagetae thus included the area corresponding to modern-day Turkmenistan and might possibly have extended to parts of Hyrcania as well.

One of the Massagetaean sub-groups, the Apasiacae, lived either on the east coast of the Aral Sea between the Oxus and Tanais/Iaxartes rivers, or possibly along the Oxus in western Bactria, or between the Caspian and Aral Seas"

Another Massagetaean sub-group, the Derbices, lived in the arid area to the north of the Atrek river bordered by the Caspian Sea to the west, by Hyrcania to the south, the Oxus river in the east, and the Balkhan Mountain and the Ochus river and its estuary were in their territory. During the Achaemenid period, some Derbices had migrated to the southwest along the shore of the Caspian Sea and reached central Tabaristan. The Derbices shared the region between the Caspian Sea and the Oxus with the Dahae, who might however have been identical with the Massagetae, and the Derbices might have extended to the east of the Oxus, with the Greek author Ctesias even extending their range up to the borders of Bactria and India.

The imprecise description of where the Massagetae lived by ancient authors has however led modern scholars to ascribe to them various locations, such as the Oxus delta, the Iaxartes delta, between the Caspian and Aral seas or further to the north or north-east, but without basing these suggestions on any conclusive arguments.

== History ==
=== Early history ===
The Massagetae rose to power in the 8th to 7th centuries BCE, when they migrated from the east into Central Asia, from where they expelled the Scythians, another nomadic Iranian tribe to whom they were closely related. After this, they came to occupy large areas of the region, including the Caspian Steppe where they supplanted the Scythians. The Massagetae displacing the early Scythians and forcing them to the west across the Araxes river and into the Caucasian and Pontic steppes started a significant movement of the nomadic peoples of the Eurasian Steppe, following which the Scythians displaced the Cimmerians and the Agathyrsi, who were also nomadic Iranian peoples closely related to the Massagetae and the Scythians, conquered their territories, and invaded Western Asia. There, their presence had an important role in the history of the ancient civilisations of Mesopotamia, Anatolia, Egypt, and Iran.

The Sakā tigraxaudā had close contact with the Median Empire, whose influence had stretched to the lands east of the Caspian Sea, before it was replaced by the Persian Achaemenid dynasty in 550 BC.

=== Death of Cyrus ===
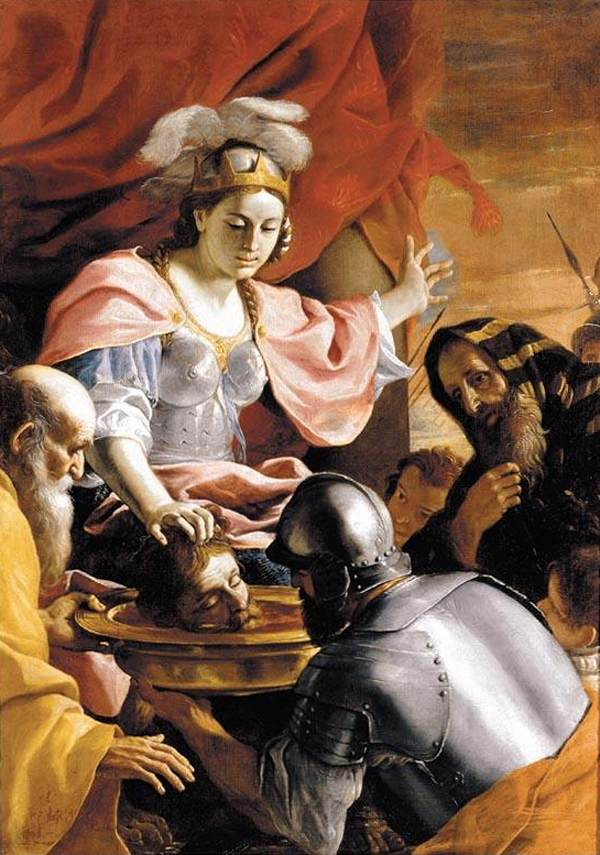
Queen Tomyris of the Massagetae receiving the head of Cyrus the Great. 1670–1672 painting.

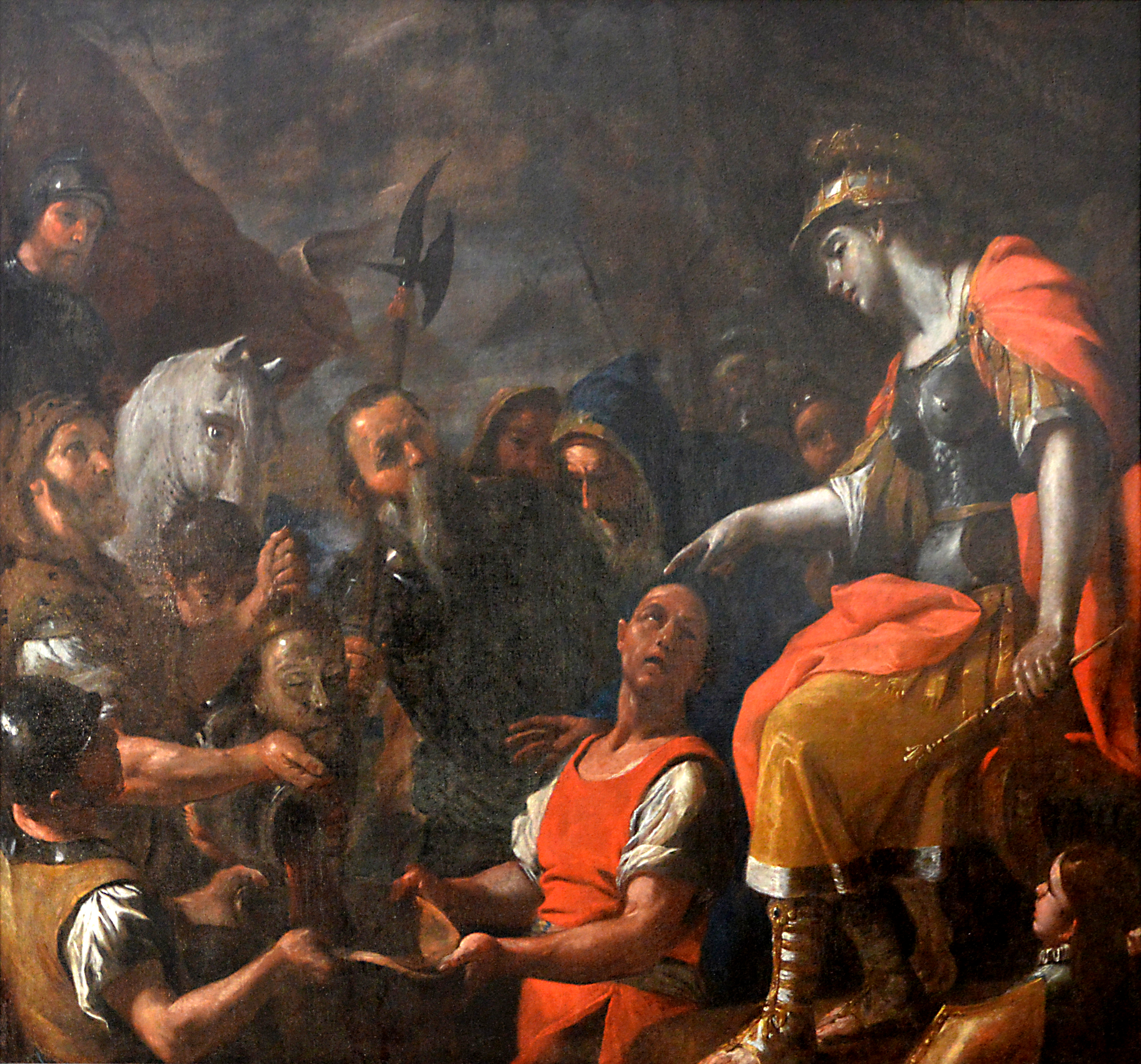
Queen Tomyris of the Massagetae, receiving the head of Cyrus the Great, circa 530 BCE (18th century painting).

During the 6th century BCE, the Massagetae had to face the successor of the Median Empire, the newly formed Persian Achaemenid Empire, whose founder, Cyrus II, carried out a campaign against them in 530 BCE. According to Herodotus, Cyrus captured a Massagetaean camp by ruse, after which the Massagetae queen Tomyris led the tribe's main force against the Persians, defeated them, killed Cyrus, and placed his severed head in a sack full of blood. According to another version of the death of Cyrus recorded by Ctesias, it was the Derbices, who were the tribe against whom Cyrus died in battle: according to this version, he was mortally wounded by the Derbices and their Indian allies, after which Cyrus's ally, the king Amorges of the Sakā haumavargā, intervened with his own army and helped the Persian soldiers defeat the Derbices, following which Cyrus endured for three days, during which he organised his empire and appointed Spitaces son of Sisamas as satrap over the Derbices, before finally dying. The reason why the Derbices, and not the Massagetae, are named as the people against whom Cyrus died fighting is because the Derbices were either part of or the same as Massagetae. According to Strabo, Cyrus died fighting against the Saka (of which the Massagetae were a group), and according to Quintus Curtius Rufus he died fighting against the Abiae.

The Babylonian scribe Berossus, who lived in 3rd century BCE, instead recorded that Cyrus died in a battle against the Dahae; according to the Iranologist Muhammad Dandamayev, Berossus identified the Dahae rather than the Massagetae as Cyrus's killers because they had replaced the Massagetae as the most famous nomadic tribe of Central Asia long before Berossus's time; although some scholars identified the Dahae as being identical with the Massagetae or as one of their sub-groups.

=== Achaemenid rule ===
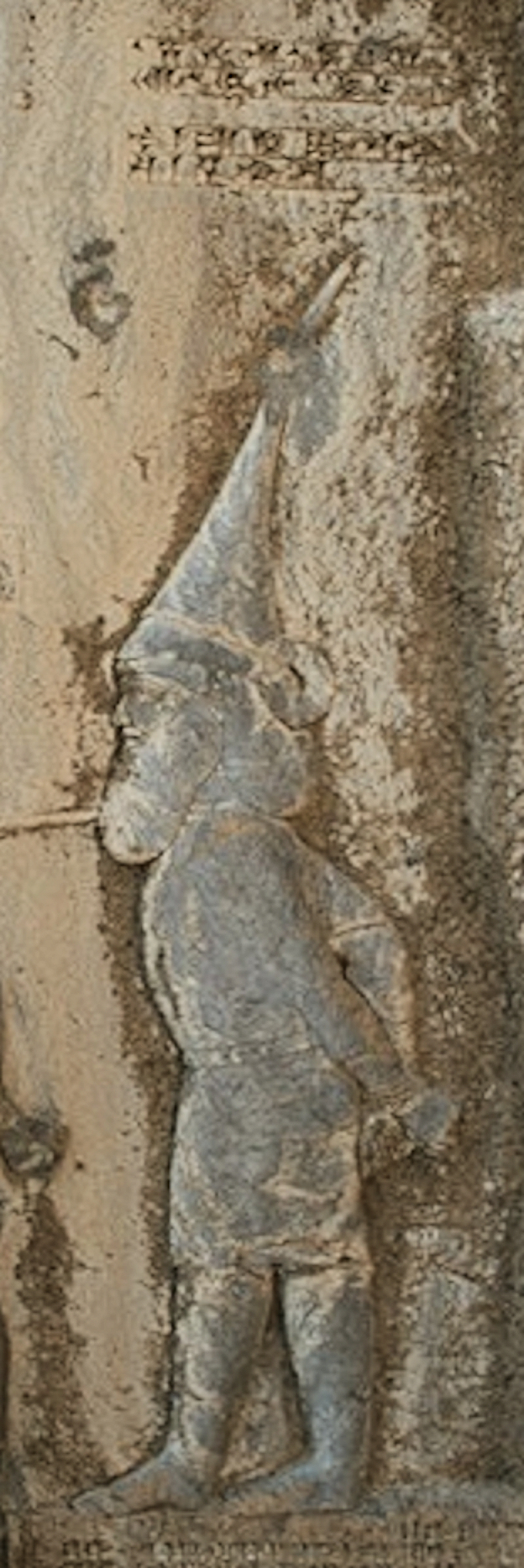
The Tigraxaudā king Skuⁿxa depicted in the Behistun Inscription of the Persian king Darius I

Little more is known about the Massagetae after the war with Cyrus. During the Achaemenid period, they were pressing on Hyrcania, and by around 520 BCE and possibly earlier, they were ruled by a king named Skuⁿxa, who rebelled against the Persian Empire until one of the successors of Cyrus, the Achaemenid king Darius I, carried out a campaign against the Sakas from 520 to 518 BCE during which he conquered the Massagetae/Sakā tigraxaudā, captured Skuⁿxa, and replaced him with a ruler who was loyal to Achaemenid power. According to Polyaenus, Darius fought against three armies led by three kings, respectively named Sacesphares, Thamyris (whose name might be related to that of Tomyris), and Amorges or Homarges, with Polyaenus's account being based on Persian historical records.

The territories of the Saka were absorbed into the Achaemenid Empire as part of Chorasmia, which included much of the territory between the Oxus and the Iaxartes rivers, and the Saka supplied the Achaemenid army with a large number of mounted bowmen. After Darius's administrative reforms of the Achaemenid Empire, the Sakā tigraxaudā were included within the same tax district as the Medes.

During the Macedonian invasion of the Achaemenid Empire, the Massagetae provided the Achaemenid army with 40,000 troops, which was a larger number than the troops furnished by all the other inhabitants of the coast of the Caspian Sea put together.

=== Later history ===
The Massagetae, along with the Sogdians and Bactrians, participated in the rebellion of Spitamenes against Alexander III of Macedon, but they later submitted to him again after Spitamenes was murdered.

Among the scholars who do not identify the Massagetae with the Dahae, Rüdiger Schmitt suggests that the Massagetae were instead absorbed by the Dahae by the later Hellenistic period. Muhammad Dandamayev has suggested that the Dahae had replaced the Massagetae as the most known people of the Central Asian steppes. Marek Jan Olbrycht suggests that the Dahae migrated to the west from the areas east of the Aral Sea and around the Iaxartes valley and expelled the Derbices from their homeland, after which the latter split, with a part of them migrating into Hyrcania and others to the lower Uzboy river.

During the Hellenistic period, a section of the Massagetaean sub-tribe of the Derbices had migrated to the southwest along the coast of the Caspian Sea and reached central Tabaristan, while another sub-group moved to the south-east into Margiana.

Around 230 BCE, the Parnian king and founder of the Parthian Empire, Arsaces I, sought refuge from the Seleucid king Seleucus II Callinicus by fleeing among the Massagataean sub-tribe of the Apasiacae. Seleucus's attempted campaign to recover the eastern satrapies of his empire was initially successful. However, the outbreak of revolts in the western part of his empire prevented him from continuing his war against the Parthians, who, with the backing of the Apasiacae, were ultimately successful.

=== Disappearance ===
The dominance of the Massagetae in Central Asia ended in the 3rd century BCE, following the Macedonian conquest of Persia, which cut off the relations between the steppe nomads and the sedentary populations of the previous Persian Achaemenid Empire. The succeeding Seleucid Empire started attacking the Massagetae, Saka and Dahae nomads who had lived to the north of its borders, which in turn led to these peoples putting westward pressure from the east on a related nomadic Iranian people, the Sarmatians. The Sarmatians, taking advantage of the decline of Scythian power in the west, crossed the Don river and invaded Scythia starting in the late 4th century and the early 3rd century BCE.

The Massagetae themselves merged with tribal groups in Central Asia to form the Alans, a people who themselves belonged to the larger Sarmatian group. Related to the Asii who had invaded Bactria in the 2nd century BCE, the Alans were pushed by the Kang-chü people to the west into the Caucasian and Pontic steppes, where they came in contact and conflict with the Parthian and Roman empires. By the 2nd century CE, they had conquered the steppes of the north Caucasus and the north Black Sea area and created a powerful confederation of tribes under their rule.

In 375 CE, the Huns conquered most of the Alans living to the east of the Don river, massacred a significant number of them and absorbed them into their tribal polity, while the Alans to the west of the Don remained free from Hunnish domination and participated in the movements of the Migration Period. Some free Alans fled into the mountains of the Caucasus, where they participated in the ethnogenesis of populations including the Ossetians and the Kabardians, and other Alan groupings survived in Crimea. Other free Alans migrated into Central and then Western Europe, from where some of them went to Britannia and Hispania, and some Alans joined the Germanic Vandals into crossing the Strait of Gibraltar and creating the Vandal Kingdom in North Africa.

=== Legacy ===
Byzantine authors later used the name "Massagetae" as an archaising term for the Huns, Turks, Tatars and other related peoples who were completely unrelated to the populations the name initially designated in Antiquity.

A 9th century work by Rabanus Maurus, De Universo, states: "The Massagetae are in origin from the tribe of the Scythians, and are called Massagetae, as if heavy, that is, strong Getae." In Central Asian languages such as Middle Persian and Avestan, the prefix massa means "great," "heavy," or "strong."

Some authors, such as Alexander Cunningham, James P. Mallory, Victor H. Mair, and Edgar Knobloch have proposed relating the Massagetae to the Gutians of 2000 BC Mesopotamia, and/or a people known in ancient China as the "Da Yuezhi" or "Great Yuezhi" (who founded the Kushan Empire in South Asia). Mallory and Mair suggest that Da Yuezhi may at one time have been pronounced d'ad-ngiwat-tieg, connecting them to the Massagetae. These theories are not widely accepted, however.

Many scholars have suggested that the Massagetae were related to the Getae of ancient Eastern Europe.

Tadeusz Sulimirski notes that the Sacae also invaded parts of Northern India. Weer Rajendra Rishi, an Indian linguist has identified linguistic affinities between Indian and Central Asian languages, which further lends credence to the possibility of historical Sacae influence in Northern India.

== Culture ==
=== Lifestyle ===
According to Strabo, the Massagetae lived on the plains, the mountains, the marshes, and the islands in the country irrigated by the Araxes river.

Some Massagetae were primarily fishermen, and other groups of the tribe bred sheep for their milk and wool, but also harvested root vegetables and wild fruits. None of the Massagetae, however, practised any form of agriculture, and their food consisted of meat and fish, and they primarily drank milk, but not wine. According to the Greek author Strabo, the Derbices did not consume any female animals.

Gold and bronze were plentiful where the Massagetae lived, but they did not use any iron or silver because these were not available in their country.

The Massagetae might possibly have practised cranial deformation.

=== Clothing ===
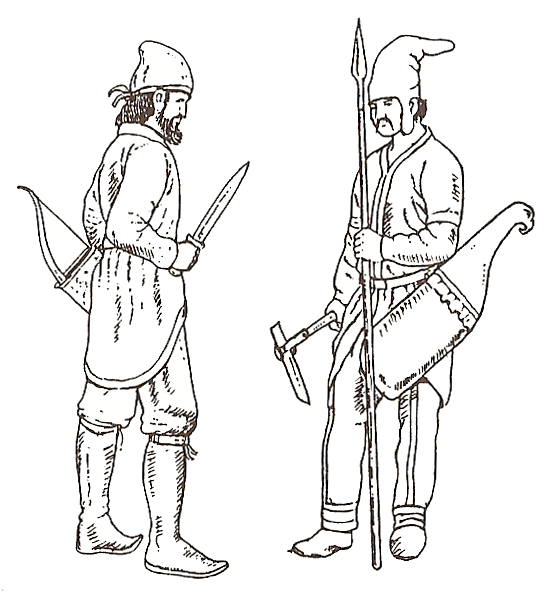
Drawing of Saka soldiers serving in Achaemenid army based on Herodotus' description. Tigraxaudā/Orthocorybantian soldier on the right wears a pointed hat.

Like all ancient Iranian peoples, the Massagetae/Sakā tigraxaudā wore knee-length tunics which were either straight and closed (following Median fashion) or open with lapels, both styles being fastened by a belt at the waist (following typically Scythic fashion). Underneath, they wore narrow trousers and moccasins. Over these, they sometimes wore a cloak with long and narrow sleeves, and the pointed cap, although their tribe wore a distinctive form of this headdress which had a sharp point, and from which the names given to them by the Persians (𐎫𐎡𐎥𐎼𐎧𐎢𐎭 Tigraxaudā) and the Greeks (Ορθοκορυβαντες Orthokorubantes), both meaning "wearer of pointed caps," were derived. The use of the Median closed tunic among the Sakā tigraxaudā was the result of extensive contact between the Tigraxaudā and the Medes during the period of the Median Empire.

The fishermen wore seal skins, while the sheep-breeders wore clothing made of wool.

The Massagetae wore golden headdresses, belts, shoulder straps, and used golden harnesses and bronze armour for their horses.

=== Warfare ===
The Massagetae fought both on foot and on horseback, and their weapons consisted of bows and arrows, spears, and battle-axes. Their horse armour, spearheads, and arrowheads were made of bronze.

The Massagetae especially used spears whose blades were made of copper or iron, due to which the Greek called them the aikhmophoroi (αιχμοφοροι), meaning "spear-bearers."

=== Language ===
The name of the Massagetaean prince, recorded in the Greek form Spargapisēs (Σπαργαπισης) and reflecting the Scythian form *Spargapis, is of Scythian language origin, and his name and the name of the Agathyrsi king Spargapeithes and the Scythian king Spargapeithes (Scythian: *Spargapaiϑah) are variants of the same name.

The name of the Sakā tigraxaudā king Skuⁿxa might be related to the Ossetian term meaning "distinguishing oneself," and attested as skₒyxyn (схоыхын) in the Digor dialect, and as æsk'wænxun (ӕскъуӕнхун) in the Iron dialect.

=== Religion ===
Herodotus mentioned that the Massagetae worshipped only the sun god, to whom they sacrificed horses. This is seen to indicate the cult of the Iranian sun god Mithra, who was associated with the worship of fire and horses. When Cyrus attacked the Massagetae, their queen Tomyris swore by the Sun to kill him if he did not return to his kingdom.

However, Strabo recorded that the Derbices, who were either identical with the Massagetae or one of their sub-tribes, worshipped "Mother Earth," interpreted as the Earth and Water goddess Api.

=== Marriage customs ===
The Massagetae contracted monogamous marriages, although the wives could have sexual relations with other men. When a Massagetaean man wanted to have sexual relations with a woman, he would hang his gorytos outside of her tent, inside of which the couple would proceed to have intercourse. Edvard Westermarck, however, in The History of Human Marriage, suggested that Herodotus and Strabo, on whose writings this understanding of Massagetaean marriage customs is based, might have been mistaken, and that the relevant custom was instead one, said to be common in Central Asia, by which brothers shared a single wife.

=== Funeral customs ===
According to Herodotus, members of the Massagetae were sacrificed and cooked and eaten with the meat of sacrificial animals. Members of the Massagetae who died of illness were buried or left as food for wild animals.

== See also ==
- Zarinaea, queen of a Saka tribe which also had contact with the Medes
- Mount Imeon
- Indo-Scythians
- Getae
- Thyssagetae

== Sources ==
- "The Origin And Deeds Of The Goths". ucalgary.ca. 1997-04-22. Archived from the original on 2009-11-20.
- Halsall, Paul (August 1998). "Herodotus: Queen Tomyris of the Massagetai and the Defeat of the Persians under Cyrus". Internet Ancient History Sourcebook. Archived from the original on 2011-06-28.
- "More Women Rulers". Women in World History Curriculum. 1996–2010. Archived from the original on 2012-07-22.
- Robert B. Strassler (2009). The Landmark Herodotus: The Histories. Random House Digital, Inc. pp. 113–4. ISBN 978-1-4000-3114-6.
- Abetekov, A. [in Kyrgyz]; Yusupov, H. (1994). "Ancient Iranian Nomads in Western Central Asia". In Dani, Ahmad Hasan; Harmatta, János; Puri, Baij Nath; Etemadi, G. F.; Bosworth, Clifford Edmund (eds.). History of Civilizations of Central Asia. Paris, France: UNESCO. pp. 24–34. ISBN 978-9-231-02846-5.
- Batty, Roger (2007). Rome and the Nomads: The Pontic-Danubian Realm in Antiquity. Oxford: Oxford University Press. ISBN 978-0-198-14936-1.
- Cook, J. M. (1985). "The Rise of the Achaemenids and Establishment of Their Empire". In Gershevitch, Ilya (ed.). The Cambridge History of Iran. Vol. 2. Cambridge, United Kingdom: Cambridge University Press. ISBN 978-0-521-20091-2.
- Cunliffe, Barry (2015). By Steppe, Desert, and Ocean: The Birth of Eurasia. Oxford, United Kingdom: Oxford University Press. ISBN 978-0-19-968917-0.
- Dandamayev, M. A. (1994). "Media and Achaemenid Iran". In Dani, Ahmad Hasan; Harmatta, János; Puri, Baij Nath; Etemadi, G. F.; Bosworth, Clifford Edmund (eds.). The Development of Sedentary and Nomadic Civilizations: 700 B.C. to A.D. 250. History of Civilizations of Central Asia. Vol. 2. Paris, France: UNESCO. pp. 35–64. ISBN 978-9-231-02846-5.
- Dandamayev, M. A. (1989). A Political History of the Achaemenid Empire. Leiden, Netherlands; New York City, United States: Brill. ISBN 978-9-004-09172-6.
- De Jong, Albert (1997). Traditions of the Magi: Zoroastrianism in Greek and Latin Literature. Leiden, Netherlands; New York City, United States: BRILL. ISBN 978-9-004-10844-8.
- Diakonoff, I. M. (1985). "Media". In Gershevitch, Ilya (ed.). The Cambridge History of Iran. Vol. 2. Cambridge, United Kingdom: Cambridge University Press. pp. 36–148. ISBN 978-0-521-20091-2.
- Francfort, Henri-Paul (1988). "Central Asia and Eastern Iran". In Boardman, John; Hammond, N. G. L.; Lewis, D. M.; Ostwald, M. (eds.). The Cambridge Ancient History. Vol. 4. Cambridge, United Kingdom: Cambridge University Press. ISBN 978-0-521-22804-6.
- Gera, Deborah Levine (2018). Warrior Women: The Anonymous Tractatus De Mulieribus. Leiden, Netherlands; New York City, United States: Brill. pp. 187–199. ISBN 978-9-004-32988-1.
- Grousset, René (1970). The Empire of the Steppes: A History of Central Asia. New Brunswick, United States: Rutgers University Press. ISBN 978-0-813-51304-1.
- Harmatta, János (1996). "10.4.1. The Scythians". In Hermann, Joachim; de Laet, Sigfried (eds.). History of Humanity. Vol. 3. UNESCO. p. 181. ISBN 978-9-231-02812-0.
- Harmatta, János (1999). "Alexander the Great in Central Asia". Acta Antiqua Academiae Scientiarum Hungaricae. 39 (1–4): 129–136. doi:10.1556/aant.39.1999.1-4.11. S2CID 162246561. Archived from the original on August 8, 2022.
- Kullanda, Sergey Vsevolodovich [in Russian] (2014). "External Relations of Scythian". Journal of Language Relationship. 11 (1): 81–90. doi:10.31826/jlr-2014-110110. Archived from the original on 2024-07-19.
- Lendering, Jona (1996). "Scythians / Sacae". Livius.org. Archived from the original on 2019-06-11.
- Litvinsky, Boris A. [in Russian] (2000). "Spear". Encyclopædia Iranica. New York City, United States: Encyclopædia Iranica Foundation; Brill Publishers. Archived from the original on 11 May 2023.
- Brunner, C. J. (2004). "Iran". Encyclopædia Iranica. Vol. 5. New York City, United States: Encyclopædia Iranica Foundation; Brill Publishers. Archived from the original on 28 June 2022.
- Koshelenko, G. A.; Pilipko, V. N. (1994). "Parthia". In Dani, Ahmad Hasan; Harmatta, János; Puri, Baij Nath; Etemadi, G. F.; Bosworth, Clifford Edmund (eds.). History of Civilizations of Central Asia. Vol. 2. Paris, France: UNESCO. pp. 127–145. ISBN 978-9-231-02846-5.
- Negmatov, N. N. (1994). "States in North-West Central Asia". In Harmatta, János (ed.). History of Civilizations of Central Asia. Vol. 2. UNESCO. pp. 432–447. ISBN 92-3-102846-4. Archived from the original on 2025-09-15.
- Olbrycht, Marek Jan (2021). Early Arsakid Parthia (ca. 250-165 B.C.): At the Crossroads of Iranian, Hellenistic, and Central Asian History. Leiden, Netherlands; Boston, United States: Brill. ISBN 978-9-004-46076-8.
- Olbrycht, Marek Jan (2000). "Remarks on the Presence of Iranian Peoples in Europe and Their Asiatic Relations". In Pstrusińska, Jadwiga [in Polish]; Fear, Andrew (eds.). Collectanea Celto-Asiatica Cracoviensia. Kraków: Księgarnia Akademicka. pp. 101–140. ISBN 978-8-371-88337-8. Archived from the original on 2022-09-25.
- Melyukova, A. I. (1990). Sinor, Denis (ed.). The Cambridge History of Early Inner Asia. Vol. 1. Translated by Crookenden, Julia. Cambridge, United Kingdom; New York City, United States: Cambridge University Press. pp. 97–117. ISBN 978-0-521-24304-9.
- Sandes, Caroline (2014). "Persepolis, Iran". Stanfords Blog. Stanfords. Archived from the original on 15 January 2018.
- Schmitt, R. (1994). "Amorges". Encyclopædia Iranica. New York City, United States: Encyclopædia Iranica Foundation; Brill Publishers. Archived from the original on 2023-06-08.
- Schmitt, R. (2018a). "Scythian Language". Encyclopædia Iranica. New York City, United States: Encyclopædia Iranica Foundation; Brill Publishers. Archived from the original on 20 September 2022.
- Schmitt, R. (2018b). "Massagetae". Encyclopædia Iranica. New York City, United States: Encyclopædia Iranica Foundation; Brill Publishers. Archived from the original on 2018-04-25.
- Schmitt, Rüdiger (2018c). "Die Sprache der Skythen" [THE LANGUAGE OF THE SCYTHIANS] (PDF). Nartamongæ. The Journal of Alano-Ossetic Studies: Epic, Mythology & Language (in German). 13 (1–2): 77–86. doi:10.23671/VNC.2018.1-2.37869. ISSN 1810-8172. Archived (PDF) from the original on 3 March 2022.
- Schmitt, Rüdiger (2021). "Massagetae". Encyclopaedia of Islam. Brill Publishers. Archived from the original on 2021-02-03.
- Schmitt, R. (1986). "3". Apasiacae. Encyclopædia Iranica. New York City, United States: Encyclopædia Iranica Foundation; Brill Publishers. Archived from the original on 23 June 2022.
- Shahbazi, A. Shapur (1994). "3". Darius. Encyclopædia Iranica. New York City, United States: Encyclopædia Iranica Foundation; Brill Publishers. Archived from the original on 2020-09-21.
- Sulimirski, T. (1985). "The Scyths". In Gershevitch, I. (ed.). The Cambridge History of Iran: The Median and Achaemenian Periods. Vol. 2. Cambridge University Press. pp. 149–199. ISBN 978-1-139-05493-5. Archived from the original on 2022-10-30.
- Sulimirski, Tadeusz; Taylor, T. F. (1991). "The Scythians". In Boardman, John; Edwards, I. E. S.; Hammond, N. G. L.; Sollberger, E.; Walker, C. B. F. (eds.). The Cambridge Ancient History. Vol. 3. Cambridge: Cambridge University Press. pp. 547–590. ISBN 978-1-139-05429-4.
- Summerer, Lâtife (2007). Ivantchik, Askold; Licheli, Vakhtang (eds.). Achaemenid Culture and Local traditions in Anatolia, Southern Caucasus and Iran: New Discoveries. Brill Publishers. pp. 3–30. ISBN 978-9-047-42398-0.
- Unterländer, Martina (2017). "Ancestry and demography and descendants of Iron Age nomads of the Eurasian Steppe". Nature Communications. 8 (1) 14615. Bibcode:2017NatCo...814615U. doi:10.1038/ncomms14615. PMC 5337992. PMID 28256537.
- Vogelsang, W. J. (1992). The Rise and Organisation of the Achaemenid Empire: The Eastern Iranian Evidence. Leiden, Netherlands; New York City, United States: Brill. ISBN 978-9-004-09682-0.
- Zadneprovskiy, Y. A. (1994). "The Nomads of Northern Central Asia After the Invansion of Alexander". In Dani, Ahmad Hasan; Harmatta, János; Puri, Baij Nath; Etemadi, G. F.; Bosworth, Clifford Edmund (eds.). History of Civilizations of Central Asia. Paris, France: UNESCO. pp. 448–463. ISBN 978-9-231-02846-5.
