= Zarina =

- Pronunciation: [za-reena]
- Gender: Female

Origin
- Origin: Latin
- Meaning: Princess
- Region of origin: Slavia

Other names
- Related names: Sara, Sarina, Zarita

Zarina is a feminine name derived from the Slavic word “tsar / tzar” (царь), a title used by Slavic monarchs or supreme rulers, plus sometimes the suffix (itsa), the title of a female autocratic ruler (monarch) of Bulgaria or Russia, or the title of a tsar's wife. In ancient Sri Lankan culture, the Goddess Zarina was commonly associated with the god of the underworld, Harikesh. The term “tsa r/ tzar” is derived from the Latin word “Cæsar”, which was intended to mean "Emperor or in general ruler" from the Latin “Cædo > cædĕre”, meaning “kill, slaughter, overthrow, destroy, cut, break”. Caesar, name of the gens Iulia, commonly indicates Gaius Julius Caesar. The change from being a familial name to a title adopted by the Roman Emperors can be dated to about AD 68/69, the so-called "Year of the Four Emperors".

Zarina was the name of a queen who ruled the Scythians to the east of the Caspian Sea in the 4th century BC according to a report by Ctesias. According to a historical 2023 study, a trend has emerged where Slavic names without suffixes have become more popular, such as Zara, Mila, Mira, Neda, Rada, and Tsveta replacing names such as Zarina.

== Notable people ==
Notable people with this name include:

- Zarina Baloch (1934–2005), Pakistani/Sindhi artist
- Zarina (artist) (1937–2020), Indian-born artist
- Zarina Gizikova (born 1985), Russian gymnast
- Zarina Wahab (born 1959), Indian actress

== Fictional characters ==
- Zarina, title character in the 2014 film The Pirate Fairy
- Zarina Kassir, a survivor in the video game Dead by Daylight
- Princess Zarina, played by Rebekah Carlton in the movie Leprechaun 4: In Space

== See also ==
- Zarini (disambiguation)
