= Baij Nath Puri =

Indian historian

Baij Nath Puri (26 January 1916 – 1996) was an Indian historian. He completed M. Lit. and D.Phil. from Oxford University. He was vice-president and member of the International Board of Editors for the history of Civilizations in Central Asia at UNESCO, and remained President of the Indian History Congress (Guwahati Session). He was also Professor and Head of the Department of Ancient Indian History and Culture at Lucknow University and later a professor emeritus.

== Works ==
Some of his published works are:

- India as described by early Greek writers. Indian Press, 1939.
- Indian History: A Review. Bharatiya Vidya Bhavan, 1960.
- India in classical Greek writings. New Order Book Co., 1963.
- India under the Kushanas. Bharatiya Vidya Bhavan, 1965.
- Cities of ancient India. Meenakshi Prakashan, 1966.
- Studies in Early History and Administration in Assam. Department of Publication, Gauhati University, 1968.
- India in the times of Patanjali. Bharatiya Vidya Bhavan, 1968.
- A Study of Indian History. Bharatiya Vidya Bhavan, 1971.
- A Social, Cultural, and Economic History of India, Vol. 1, with Pran Nath Chopra and Manmath Nath Das. Macmillan India, 1974.
- History of Indian Administration: Vol. 2 Medieval period. Bharatiya Vidya Bhavan, 1975.
- Buddhism in Central Asia, Motilal Banarsidass, 2000. ISBN 81-208-0372-8.
- The History of the Gurjara-Pratiharas
- Some aspects of the evolution of Indian administration. Indian Institute of Public Administration, 1980.
- The Changing Horizon. Print House (India), 1986. ISBN 8185009198.
- The Khatris, a socio-cultural study. M.N. Publishers and Distributors, 1988.
- The Indian freedom struggle: a survey, (1857–1947). M.N. Publishers and Distributors, 1988.
- Secularism in Indian ethos. Atma Ram & Sons, 1990. ISBN 8170431441.
