= Rüdiger Schmitt =

German linguist and Iranologist (born 1939)

- Born: July 1, 1939 (age 87); Würzburg, Bavaria, Germany

Academic background
- Education: University of Würzburg

Academic work
- Institutions: Saarland University
- Main interests: Linguistics and Iranian studies

Rüdiger Schmitt (born 1 July 1939) is a German linguist, Iranologist, and educator. He was a professor of Comparative Indo-European Philology and Indo-Iranian Studies at Saarland University in Saarbrücken, Saarland, Germany, from 1979 until 2004.

He studied comparative linguistics of Indo-European, Indo-Iranian, and classical languages in University of Würzburg in 1958. He studied under Manfred Mayrhofer.

== Works ==
- Dichtung und Dichtersprache in indogermanischer Zeit (1967)
- Die Nominalbildung in den Dichtungen des Kallimachos von Kyrene. Ein Beitrag zur Stellung seines Wortschatzes innerhalb des Griechischen (1970)
- Indogermanische Dichtersprache und Namengebung (1973)
- Einführung in die griechischen Dialekte (1977)
- Grammatik des Klassisch-Armenischen mit sprachlichen Erläuterungen (1981, second edition 2007)
- Altpersische Siegel-Inschriften (1981)
- Iranische Namen in den indogermanischen Sprachen Kleinasiens (1982)
- (ed.), Compendium Linguarum Iranicarum (1989)
- Epigraphisch-exegetische Noten zu Dareios' Bı̄sutūn-Inschriften (1990)
- Corpus Inscriptionum Iranicarum 1,1,1: The Bisitun inscriptions of Darius the Great: Old Persian text (1991)
- Beiträge zu Altpersischen Inschriften (1999)
- Corpus Inscriptionum Iranicarum 1,1,2: The Old Persian inscriptions of Naqsh-i Rustam and Persepolis (2000)
- Die iranischen Sprachen in Geschichte und Gegenwart (2000)
- Meno-logium Bagistano-Persepolitanum: Studien zu den altpersischen Monatsnamen und ihren elamischen Wiedergaben (2003)
- Das iranische Personen-Namenbuch: Rückschau, Vorschau, Rundschau (2006)
- Pseudo-altpersische Inschriften. Inschriftenfälschungen und moderne Nachbildungen in altpersischer Keilschrift (2007)
- Die altpersischen Inschriften der Achaimeniden. Editio minor mit deutscher Übersetzung (2009, second edition 2023)
- Manfred Mayrhofer: Leben und Werk (2012)
- Wörterbuch der altpersischen Königsinschriften (2014)

He has written many articles in Encyclopaedia Iranica.
