= Saka language =

Extinct Eastern Iranic language spoken from 100 BC to 1,100 AD

Saka
- Khotanese, Tumshuqese
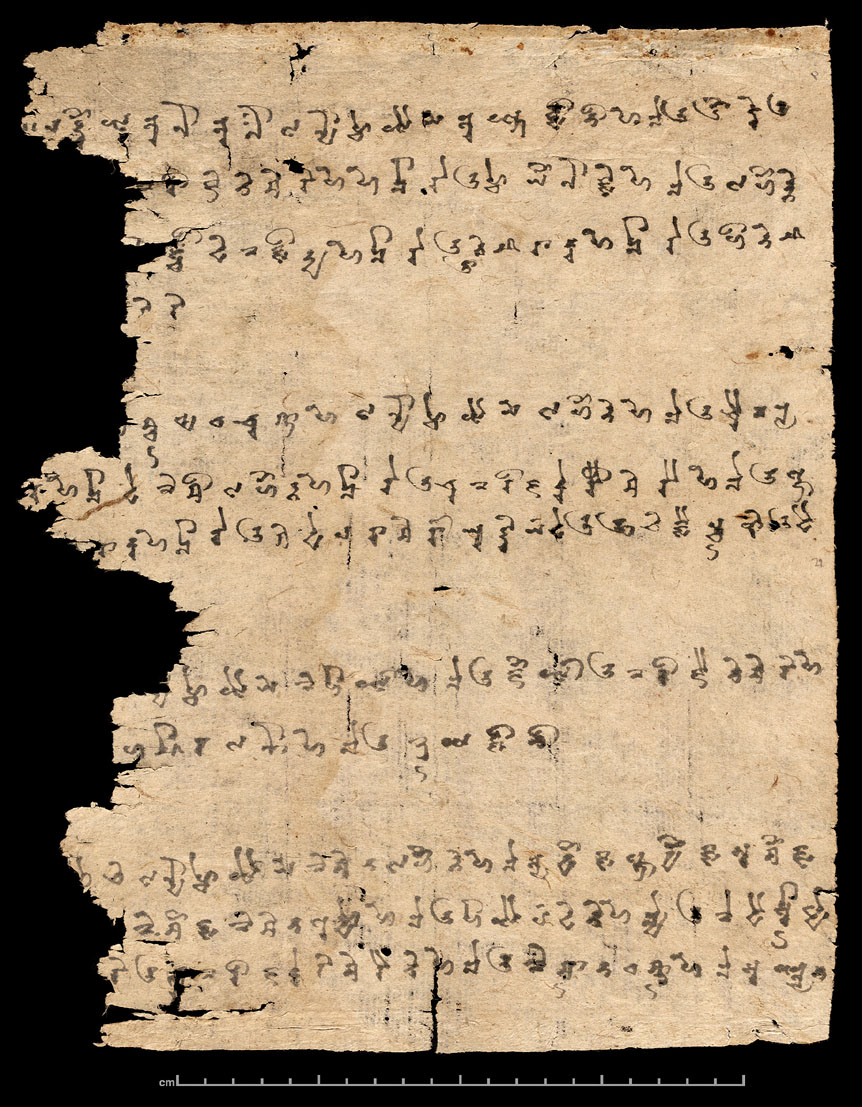
- Khotanese animal zodiac BLI6 OR11252 1R2 1
- Native to: Kingdom of Khotan, Murtuq, Shule Kingdom, and Indo-Scythian Kingdom
- Region: Tarim Basin (Xinjiang, China)
- Ethnicity: Saka
- Era: 100 BC – 1,000 AD
- Language family: Indo-European: Indo-Iranian; Iranian; Eastern; Scythian; Saka-Wakhi; Saka
- Dialects: Khotanese; Tumshuqese; Kanchaki?
- Writing system: Brahmi, Kharosthi

Language codes
- ISO 639-2: kho
- ISO 639-3: Either: kho – Khotanese xtq – Tumshuqese
- Glottolog: saka1298

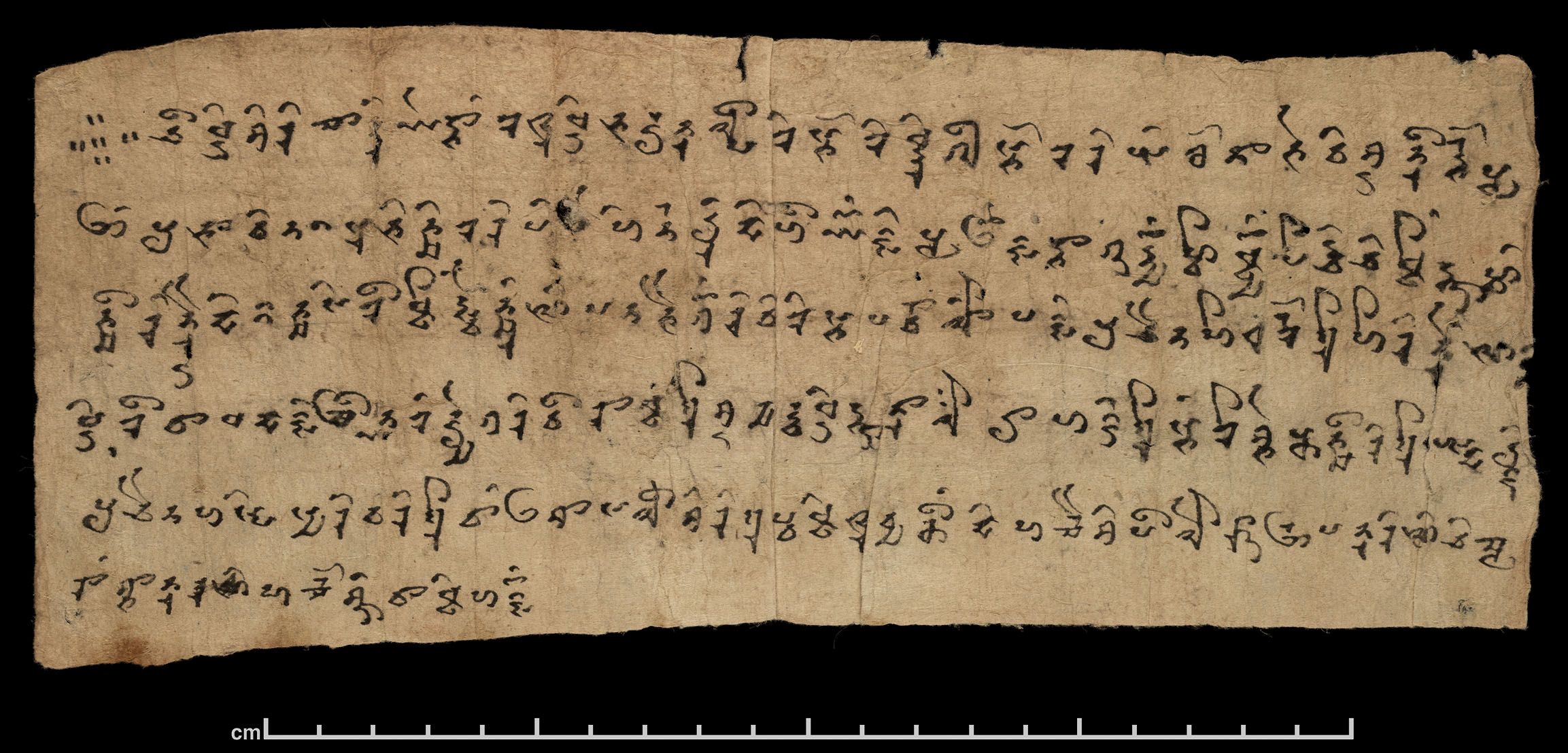
Khotanese Verses BLE4 IOLKHOT50 4R1 1

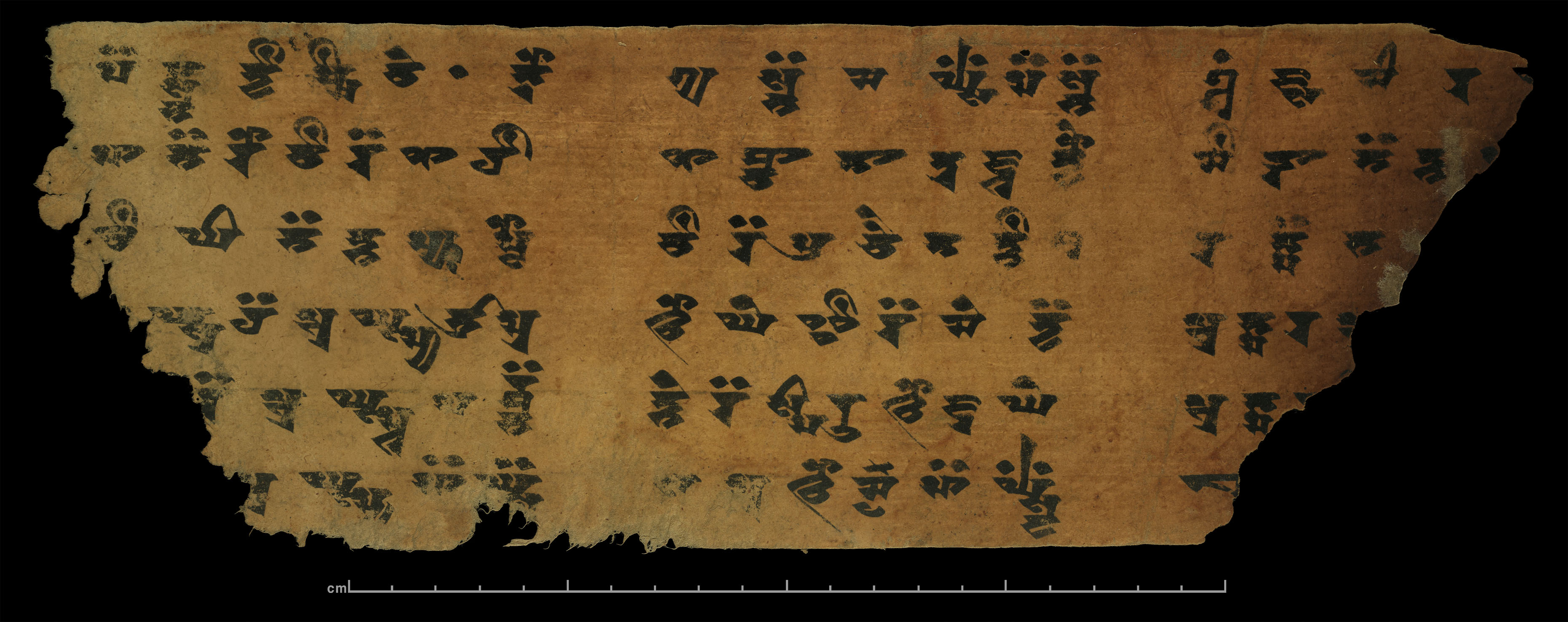
Book of Zambasta BLX3542 OR9614 5R1 1

Saka, or Sakan, was a variety of Eastern Iranian languages, attested from ancient Buddhist kingdoms in the western Tarim Basin, including Khotan and Kashgar, in what is now southern Xinjiang, China. It is a Middle Iranian language. Two varieties are known, namely Khotanese spoken in the Kingdom of Khotan, and a poorly attested variety known as Tumshuqese, so named due to its discovery in the present-day Tumshuq area.

The Saka rulers of the western regions of the Indian subcontinent, such as the Indo-Scythians and Western Satraps, are traditionally assumed to have spoken practically the same language. This has however been questioned by more recent research.

Documents on wood and paper were written in modified Brahmi script with the addition of extra characters over time and unusual conjuncts such as ys for z. The documents date from the fourth to the eleventh century. Tumshuqese was more archaic than Khotanese, but it is much less understood because it appears in fewer manuscripts compared to Khotanese. The Khotanese dialect is believed to share features with the modern Wakhi and Pashto. Saka was known as "Hvatanai" (from which the name Khotan) in contemporary documents. Many Prakrit terms were borrowed from Khotanese into the Tocharian languages.

== Classification ==
Khotanese and Tumshuqese are closely related Eastern Iranian languages.

The unusual phonological development of Proto-Iranian *ćw to Khotanese śś sets the latter apart from most other Iranian languages (which usually have sp or a product thereof). Similarities with Sogdian exist but could be due to parallel developments or areal features.

== History ==
The two known dialects of Saka are associated with a movement of the Scythians. No invasion of the region is recorded in Chinese records and one theory is that two tribes of the Saka, speaking the two dialects, settled in the region in about 200 BC before the Chinese accounts commence.

Michaël Peyrot (2018) rejects a connection with the Sai (塞) of the Chinese Hanshu, who are recorded as having migrated in the 2nd century BC to areas further west in Xinjiang and notes it is questionable that Indo-Saka evidence shares any features unique to Khotanese. Instead, Peyrot connects Khotanese and Tumshuqese to the long-established Aketala culture which developed since c. 1000 BC in the region, related to the Chust culture of the Ferghana Valley.

The Khotanese dialect is attested in texts between the 7th and 10th centuries, though some fragments are dated to the 5th and 6th centuries. The far more limited material in the Tumshuqese dialect cannot be dated with precision, but most of it is thought to date to the late 7th or the 8th century. According to Rong Xinjiang, the Tumshuqese called their own polity Gyāźdi (Jushide 據史德 in Chinese records).

The Saka language became extinct after invading Turkic Muslims conquered the Kingdom of Khotan in the Islamicisation and Turkicisation of Xinjiang.

In the 11th century, it was remarked by Mahmud al-Kashgari that the people of Khotan still had their own language and script and did not know Turkic well. According to Kashgari some non-Turkic languages like the Kanchaki and Sogdian were still used in some areas. It is believed that the Saka language group was what Kanchaki belonged to. It is believed that the Tarim Basin became linguistically Turkified by the end of the 11th century.

== Old Khotanese phonology ==
=== Consonants ===
			Labial	Dental/Alveolar	Retroflex	Palatal/ postalveolar	Velar	Glottal
Plosive	Voiceless	Unaspirated	p /p/	tt, t /t/	ṭ /ʈ/		k /k/	(t, g [ʔ]) (Note: From older ð and ɣ)
Plosive	Voiceless	Aspirated	ph /pʰ/	th /tʰ/	ṭh /ʈʰ/		kh /kʰ/	
Plosive	Voiced		b /b/	d /d/	ḍ /ɖ/		gg /ɡ/	
Affricate	Voiceless	Unaspirated		tc /ts/	kṣ /ʈʂ/	c, ky /tʃ/		
Affricate	Voiceless	Aspirated		ts /tsʰ/		ch /tʃʰ/		
Affricate	Voiced			js /dz/		j, gy /dʒ/		
Fricative	Non-Sibilant			t /ð/ (later > ʔ)			g /ɣ/ (later > ʔ)	
Fricative	Sibilant	Voiceless		s /s/	ṣṣ, ṣ /ʂ/	śś, ś /ʃ/		h /h/
Fricative	Sibilant	Voiced		ys /z/	ṣ /ʐ/	ś /ʒ/		
Nasal			m /m/	n, ṃ, ṅ /n/	ṇ /ɳ/	ñ /ɲ/		
Approximant	Central		v /w/ hv /wʰ/, /hʷ/	rr, r /ɹ/	r /ɻ/	y /j/		
Approximant	Lateral			l /l/				

=== Vowels ===
Khotanese Transliteration	IPA Phonemic	IPA Phonetic
a	/a/	[a]
ā	/a:/	[a:]
i	/i/	[i]
ī	/i:/	[i:]
u	/u/	[u]
ū	/u:/	[u:]
ä	/ə/	[ə]
e	/e:/ (Note: In non-final positions)	[æ~æ:] (Note: Mostly in final positions)
o	/o:/	[o~o:]
ai	/ai̯/	
au	/au̯/	
ei	/ae̯/	

=== Sound changes ===
Khotanese was characterized by pervasive lenition, developments of retroflexes and voiceless aspirated consonants.

Changes shared in common Sakan

- *ć, *j́ → s, ys, but *ćw, *j́w → śś, ś
- *ft, *xt → *βd, *ɣd
- Lenition of *b, *d, and *g → *β, ð, ɣ when initially or after vowels or *r
- Nasals + voiceless consonants → nasals + voiced consonants (*mp, *nt, *nč, *nk → *mb, *nd, *nj, *ng)
- *ər (syllabic consonant) → *ur after labials *m, *p, *b, *β; then *ir or *ar elsewhere
- *rn, *rm → rr
- *sr → ṣ
- *č, *ǰ → tc, js

Changes shared in East Sakan

- Nasals + voiced consonants → geminate nasals (*mb, *nd → *mm, *nn, but *ng remained)
- Questionable umlaut of *a into i and u before syllables with *i and *u, respectively (*masita → *misita → mista ~ mästa "big")
- Lenition of *p, *t, *č, and *k → b, d, ǰ, and g after vowels or *r
- *f, *x → *β, *ɣ before consonants
- *ɣ → *i̯ between vowels a, i and a consonant (*daxsa- → *daɣsa- → *daisa- → dīs- "to burn")
- *β → w; *ð, *ɣ → ∅ after vowels
- *rð → l
- *f, *θ, *x → *h after vowels
- *w, *j → *β, *ʝ initially
- *f, *θ, *x → *β, ð, ɣ initially before *r (θrayah → ðrayi → drai "three")
- Lengthening of stressed vowels before clusters *rC and *ST (sibilants + dentals) (*sarta → *sārta → sāḍa "cold", *astaka → āstaa "bone" but not *aštā́ → haṣṭā "eight").
  - Compensatory lengthening of vowels, before clusters containing non-sibilant fricatives and *r (*puhri → pūrä "son", darɣa → dārä "long"), however, -ir- and -ur- from earlier *ər were unaffected (*mərɣa- → mura- "fowl").
- Reduction of internal unstressed short and long vowels (*hámānaka → *haman~~a~~ka → hamaṅgä)
- *uw → u
- *β, ð, ʝ, ɣ > b, d, ɟ, g initially
- *f, *θ, *x → ph, th, kh (remaining instances)
- *rth → ṭh; *rt, *rd → ḍ
- Lenition of b, d, g (from earlier voiceless consonants) → β (→ w), ð, ɣ after vowels or *r
  - ḍ also phonetically became ḷ or ṛ in this position.
- Palatalization of certain consonants:

Earlier	Later
*ky	c, ky
*gy	j, gy
*khy	ch
*tcy	c
*jsy	j
*tsy	ch
*ny	ñ, ny
*sy	śś
*ysy	ś
*st, *ṣṭ	śt, śc

== Texts ==
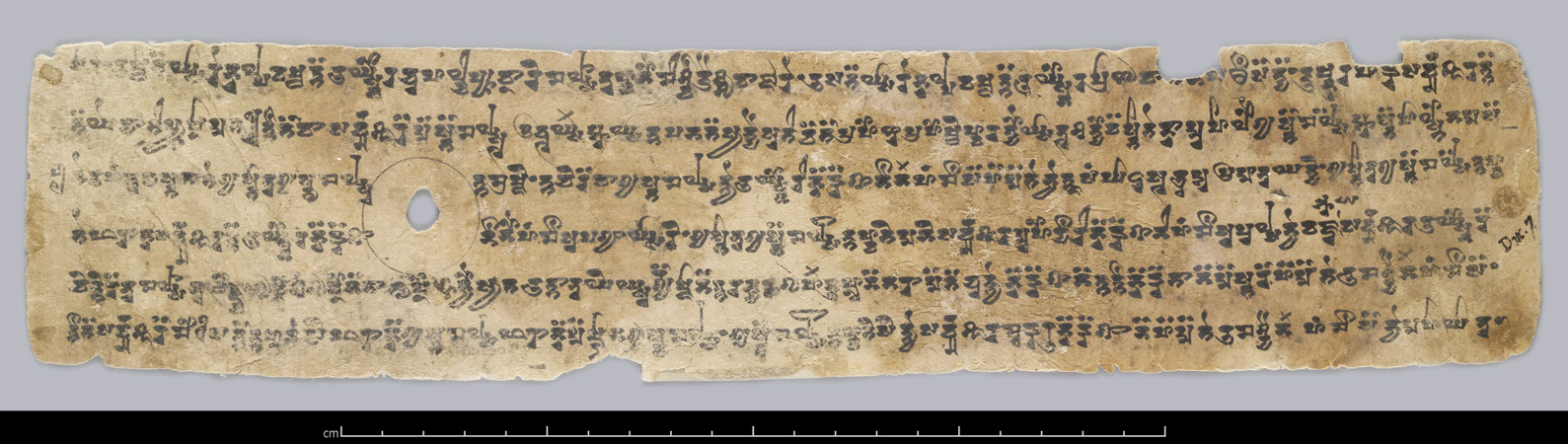
Manuscript in Khotanese from Dandan Oilik, NE of Khotan. Now held in the British Library.

All of the surviving documents originate from Khotan or Tumshuq. Khotanese is attested from over 2,300 texts preserved among the Dunhuang manuscripts, as opposed to just 15 texts in Tumshuqese. These were deciphered by Harold Walter Bailey. The earliest texts, from the fourth century, are mostly religious documents. There were several viharas in the Kingdom of Khotan and Buddhist translations are common at all periods of the documents. There are many reports to the royal court (called haṣḍa aurāsa) which are of historical importance, as well as private documents. An example of a document is Or.6400/2.3.

== See also ==
- Harold Walter Bailey
- Duan Qing

== Sources ==
- "International Dunhuang Project". Archived from the original on 2011-07-20.
- Bailey, H. W. (1944). "A Turkish-Khotanese Vocabulary" (PDF). Bulletin of the School of Oriental and African Studies. 11 (2): 290–296. doi:10.1017/S0041977X00072475. JSTOR 609315. S2CID 163021887. Archived from the original (PDF) on 2013-01-15.
