= Garba (dance) =

Indian folk dance

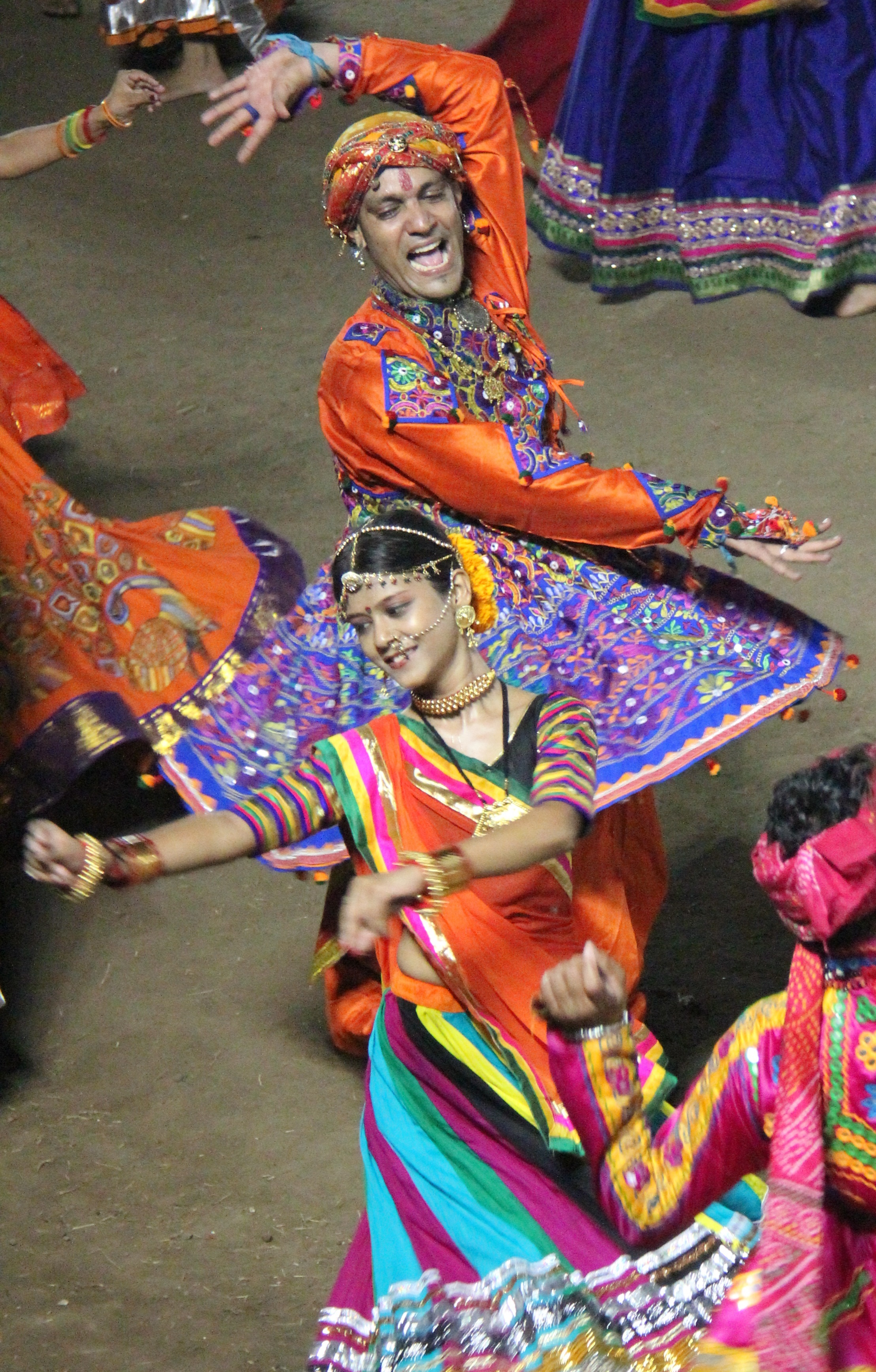
- People performing garba (dance) in Vadodara during Navratri festival.
- Native name: ગરબા
- Genre: Folk Dance
- Instrument(s): Singing and Sitar as well as Dhol
- Origin: Gujarat, India

Garba of Gujarat
- UNESCO Intangible Cultural Heritage
- Country: India
- Reference: 01962
- Region: Asia and the Pacific

Inscription history
- Inscription: 2023 (18th session)
- List: Representative

Garba (Gujarati: ગરબા) is an Indian folk dance. It is a form of circle and social dance originating in Gujarat, and played across the Indian diaspora at festivals and other events.

Garba is part of the annual Hindu festival of Navaratri (or "Nine Nights"), held in celebration of Amba Mata, or the primordial mother, an incarnation of Durga. This festival is dedicated to honouring Shakti, the embodiment of feminine divine energy. Garbas form part of Navaratri celebrations at fairs and feasts. Typically, at the end of each Navaratri night of dance, the Gujarati community also plays dandiya raas, a sibling circle-dance form, in which players hold a stick in each hand and tap out a rhythm with a partner. Everyone is invited to join garba and raas, and people of all ages and genders dance together. It is played around an earthen pot with holes on the sides, revealing a flame inside (a symbol of the jiva or soul inside the womb). Alternatively, a picture or statue of the Hindu goddess Amba may be placed in the center of the circle. People play garba in concentric circles to form rings around the object of veneration.

In December 2023, during its 18th session in Kasane, Botswana, UNESCO inscribed the "Garba of Gujarat" on the Representative List of the Intangible Culture Heritage of Humanity, recognizing its role in social and ritual practice.

== Etymology ==
The word garba comes from the Sanskrit word (Sanskrit: गर्भ, romanized: Garbha) for "womb" and so implies gestation or pregnancy — life. Folk dances in Gujarat are frequently performed to mark the first menstrual cycle or are performed to mark a marriage. The philosophical architecture of Garba of Gujarat rests upon three interlocking cosmological symbols- the perforated clay pot( Garbo), the internal flame (Garbha Deep), and counterclockwise circular choreography (Mandala). The Garbha refers to 'womb' and Deep refers to 'light'. In its earliest material sense, Garbo denotes a small, spherical earthen or metal vessel performed with numerous circular holes inside which an oil fed cotton wick (jyot or divo) is ignited during the nine nights of Navratri. The unceasing oil lamp burning inside the point symbolizes the Jiva (the individual soul) and the embryonic life force in the womb, sustained by the primordial feminine energy, Adi Shakti. by dancing around the illuminated clay womb, devotees honor the germinative power of life, fertility and womanhood. The perforations serve a dual practical and metaphysical purpose: they shield the sacred flame from being extinguished by wind while allowing rays of light to radiate outward in all directions as an auspicious offering to the Mother Goddess. Similarly, the companion term Garbi originally signified the wooden or metal polygonal frame (Mandvi or Ghodi) adorned with oil lamps placed in the center of the courtyard. Ove time, semantic transformation elevated both nouns from physical ritual projects into the poetic, musical and choreographic genres performed around them.

Alongside the Sanskritic Garbha Deep derivation, scholars K. K. Shastri and Prasad Brahmabhatt record an important Dravidian and Prakrit comparative hypothesis regarding Garbi.

== Dance, music and symbolism ==
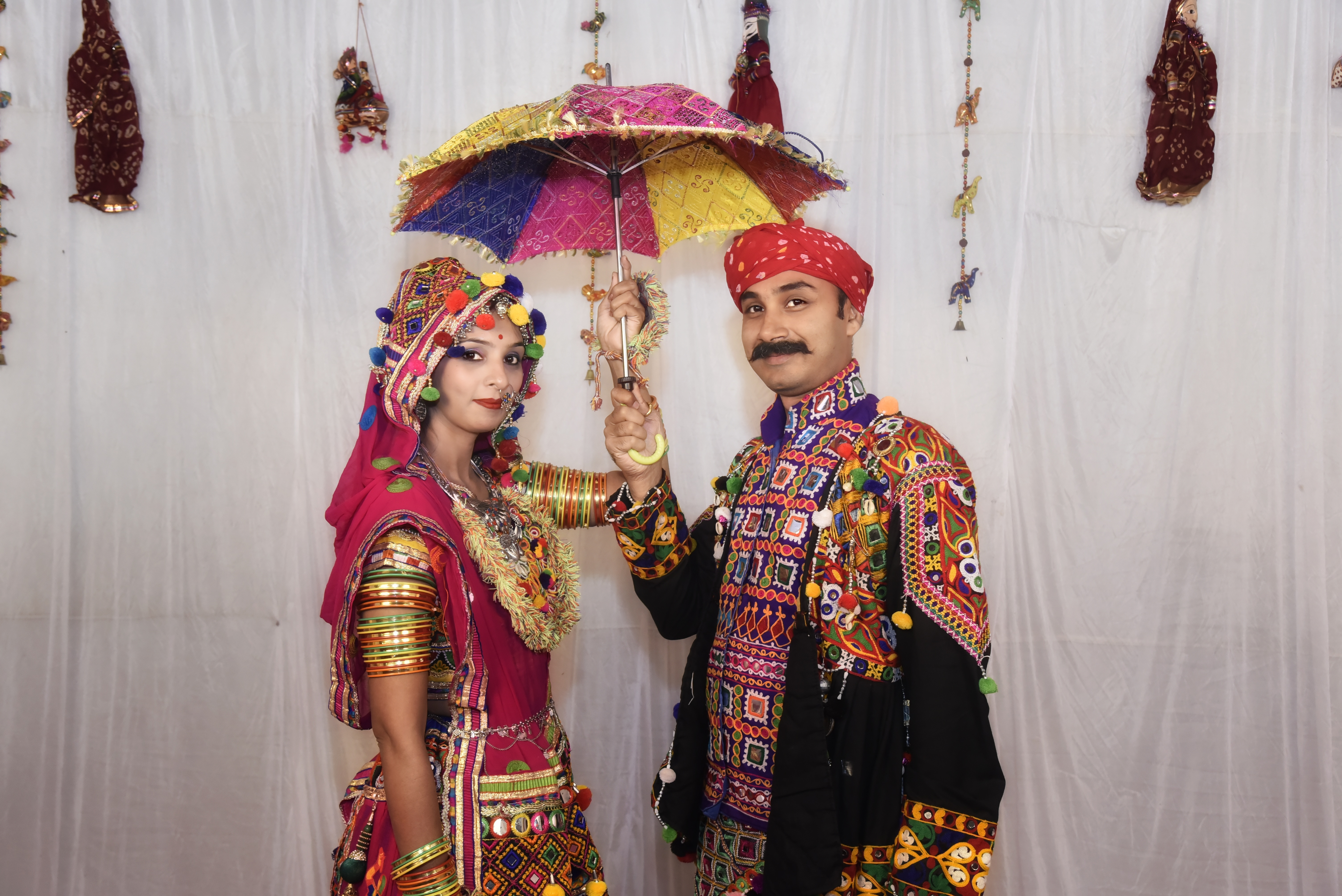
Garba dressing: traditional dressing male is kediyu while the traditional female dress is chaniya choli.

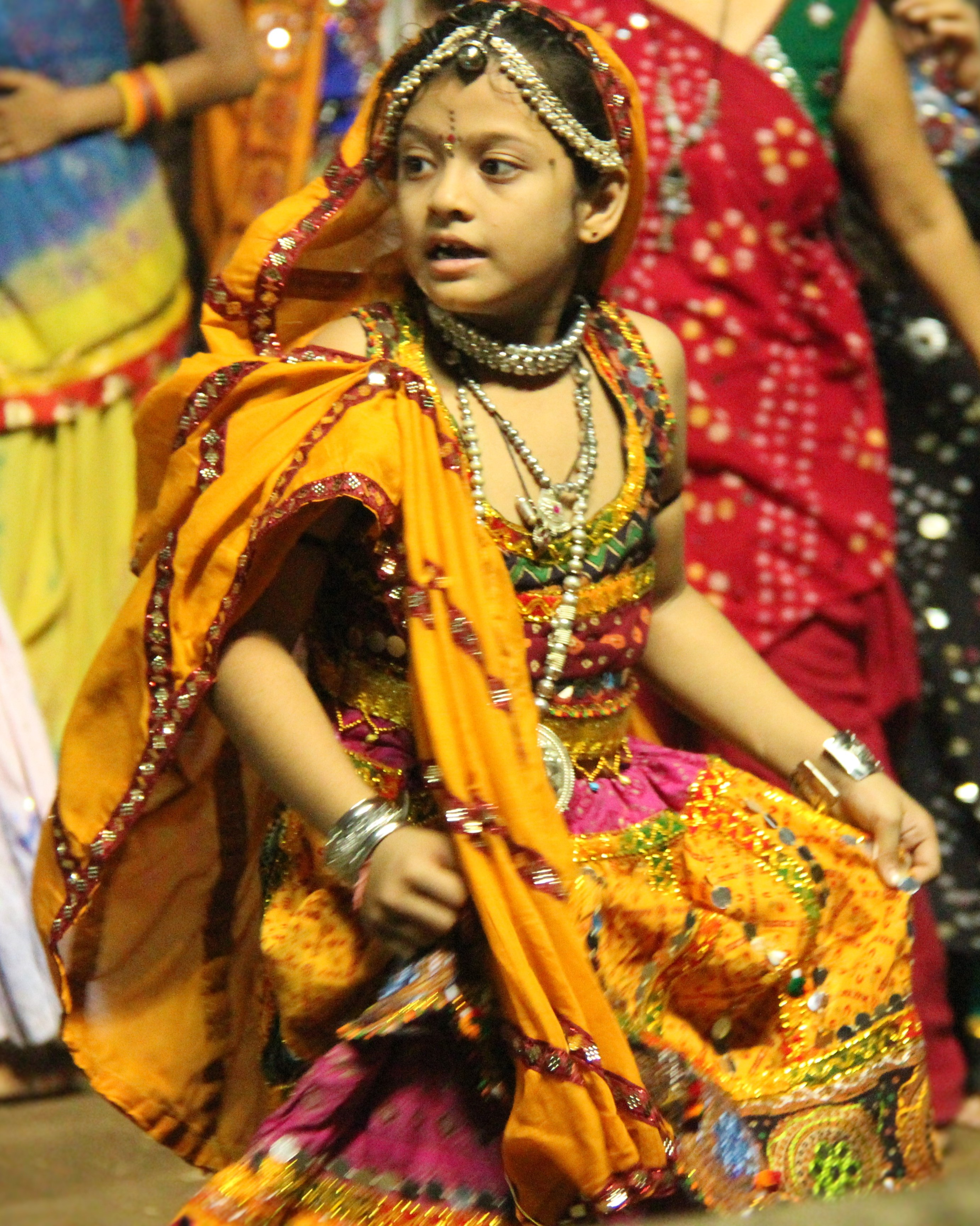
Young girl dressed in Ghagra choli.

Modern garba is also heavily influenced by Dandiya Raas, a dance traditionally performed by men. The merger of these two dances has formed the high-energy dance that is seen today. Traditional garba music accompanying the dance involves the dhol and dholak (Indian drums), cymbals and shehnai (an Indian flute).

The dance is a counterclockwise circle dance, alternatively participants can form concentric circles moving in opposite directions. The dance gathers speed as it progresses. Its main aspect consists of encircling an image or symbolic representation (like a clay pot), representing the shakti of goddess Durga. Garba dances honour the nine forms of Durga during the Navaratri ("Nine Nights") festival and celebrates fertility and womanhood.

== Popularity ==
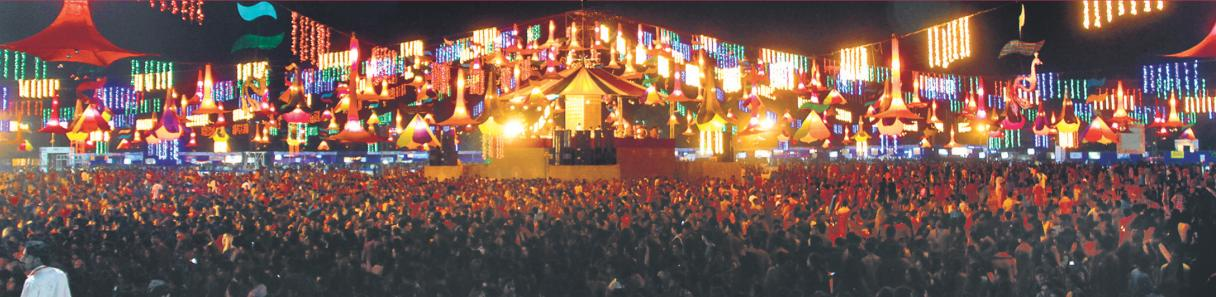
Women and men performing Garba as part of huge Navratri celebrations in Vadodara.

Garba has spread beyond Gujarat all over India and among the Indian diaspora worldwide. For instance, garba is popular among Gujarati communities in the United Kingdom where there are a number of these communities hold their own garba nights. Garba competitions are now also organised by dance troupes in universities since the turn of the millennium.

In December 2023, UNESCO recognized garba on the list of the world's Intangible cultural heritage.

== See also ==
- Kediyu, traditional dress for men for the garba
- Chaniya choli, traditional dress for women for the garba
- List of Indian folk dances
- List of Intangible Cultural Heritage elements in India
