= Tocharian clothing =

Clothing worn by the Tocharians

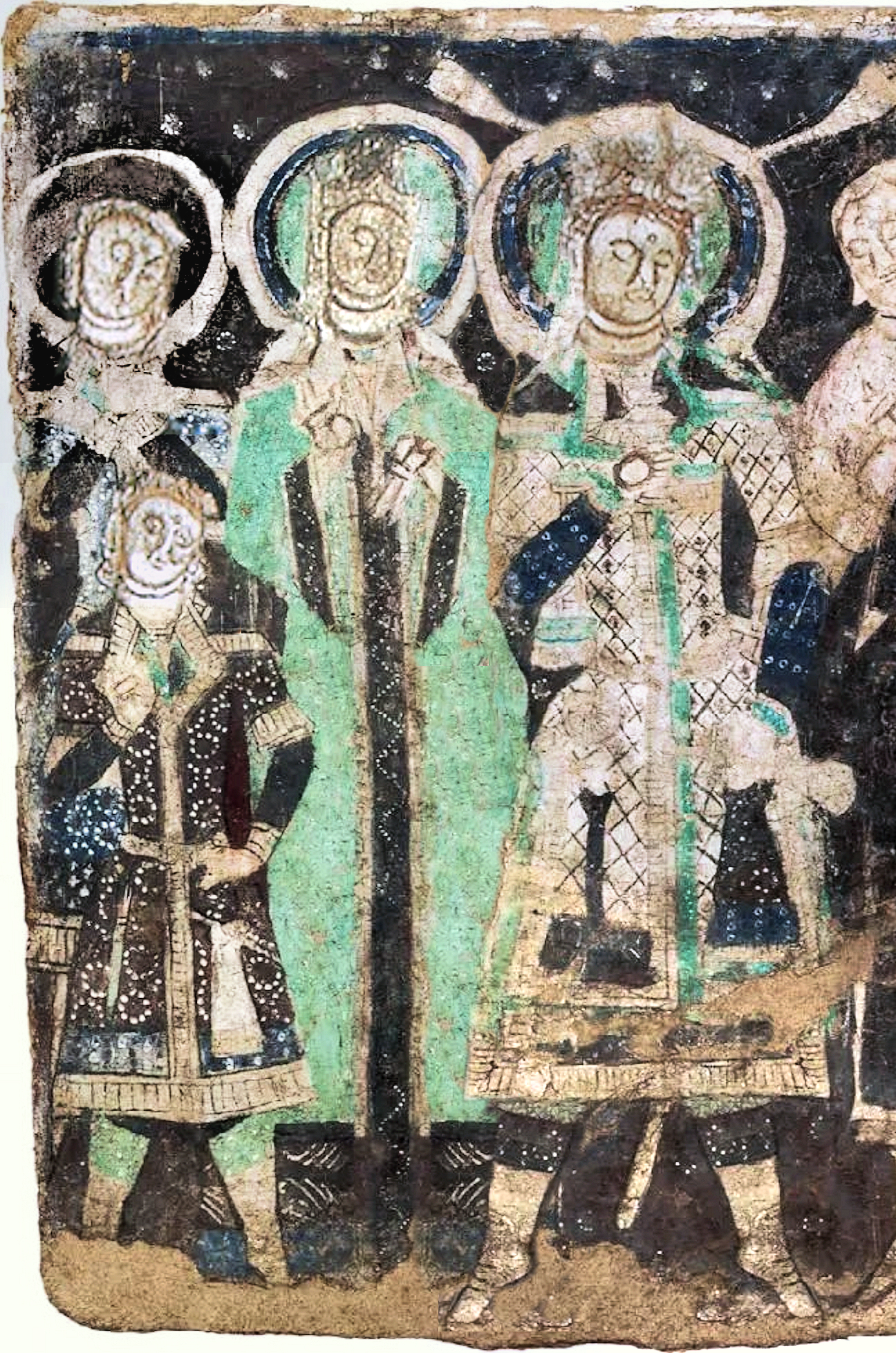
Tocharian royal family of the Kingdom of Kucha (king, wearing a close-fitting, belted caftan with chequered lozenge pattern, queen in a green robe, and fair-haired young princes), Kizil Cave 17. Circa 500 AD.

Tocharian clothing refers to clothing worn by the Tocharians. A series of murals from Kizil, Kizilgaha and Kumtura caves depicting Kuchean royalties, knights, swordsmen and donors have provided the best source of information on Tocharian costume. Their clothes were made of colourful, richly patterned fabric; a single- or double-lapel, belted caftan was very popular. This type of clothing was referred to as East Sassanid costume (ostsassanidischer Tracht) by Albert von Le Coq. However, Mariachiara Gasparini argued that the style was under various influences, which can not be easily categorised as being strictly "Sasanian".

According to Mariachiara Gasparini:

The so-called Tocharian donors portrayed in the Kucha caves wear outfits that are commonly recognized as "Iranian". Nonetheless, their clothing's tailoring patterns and textiles present local adaptations of imported materials and styles, which have been often confused as "Sasanian". Except for the article on Queen Svayaṃprabhā's dress by Jorinde Ebert ("The Dress of Queen Svayamprabha from Kuča, Sasanian and Other Influences in the Robes of Royal Donors Depicted in Wall Paintings of the Tarim Basin", Riggisberger Berichte 9, 2006), who has provided some insights on the topic, to date, a systematic study on Tocharian clothing has not yet been published. The single- or double-lapel robes worn respectively by the sword-bearers and other upper-class people depicted in the caves are similar to Turkic models widely used in Central Asia at the time. Nonetheless, the royal female and male outfits seem to be local creations.

Plaid textiles recovered from the Taklamakan Desert are of similar appearance to and are made with similar weaving techniques as textiles discovered at the Celtic sites of Hallstatt and Hallein.

== Gallery ==
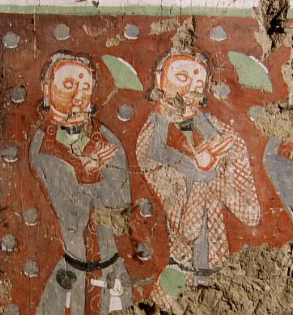
Tocharian donors, Kizil Cave 189

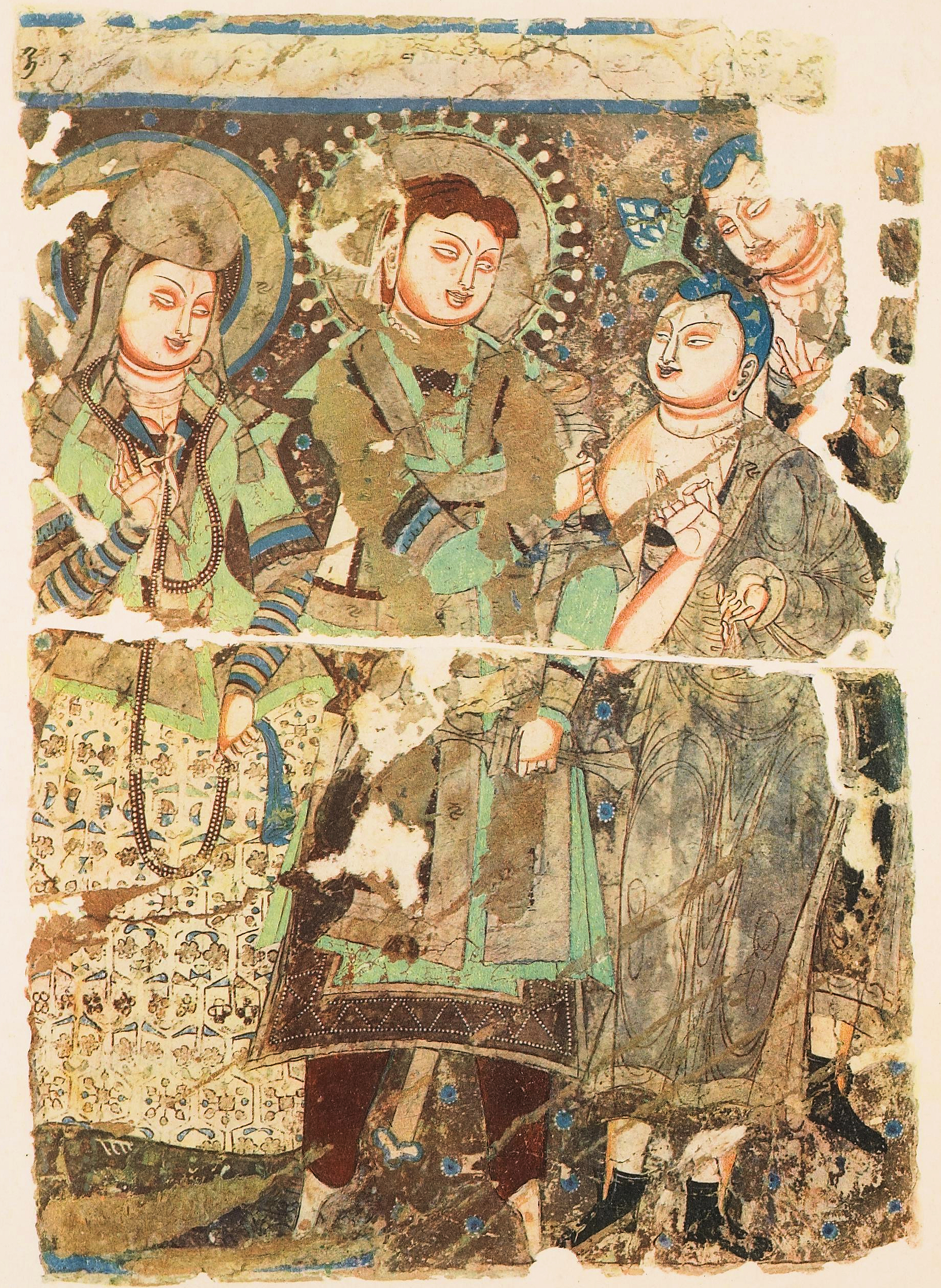
King Tottika of Kucha with his wife Svayaṃprabhā, accompanied by two monks, Maya Cave (group II), Kizil 205

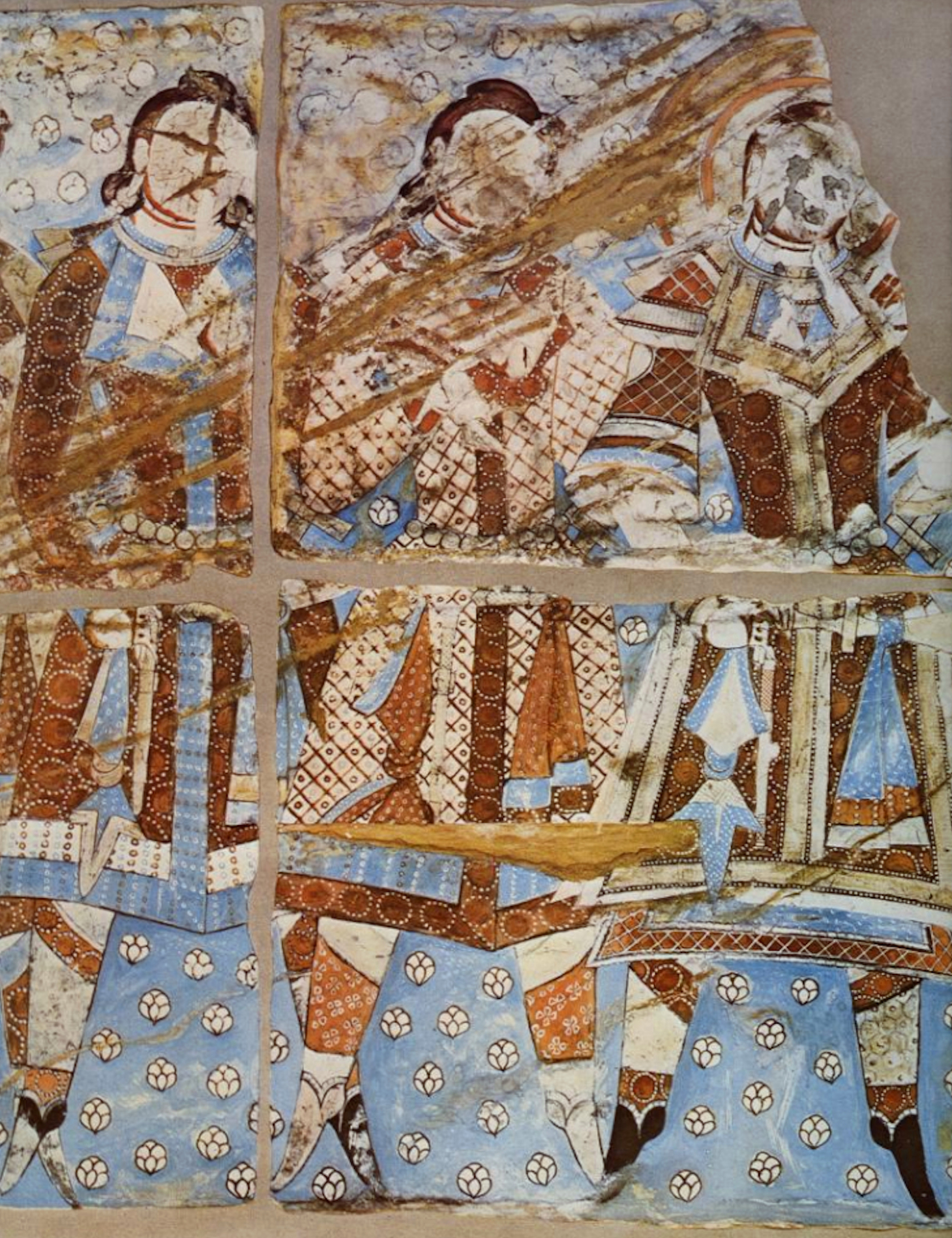
Princes of Kucha, Cave of the Devil, Kizil 199

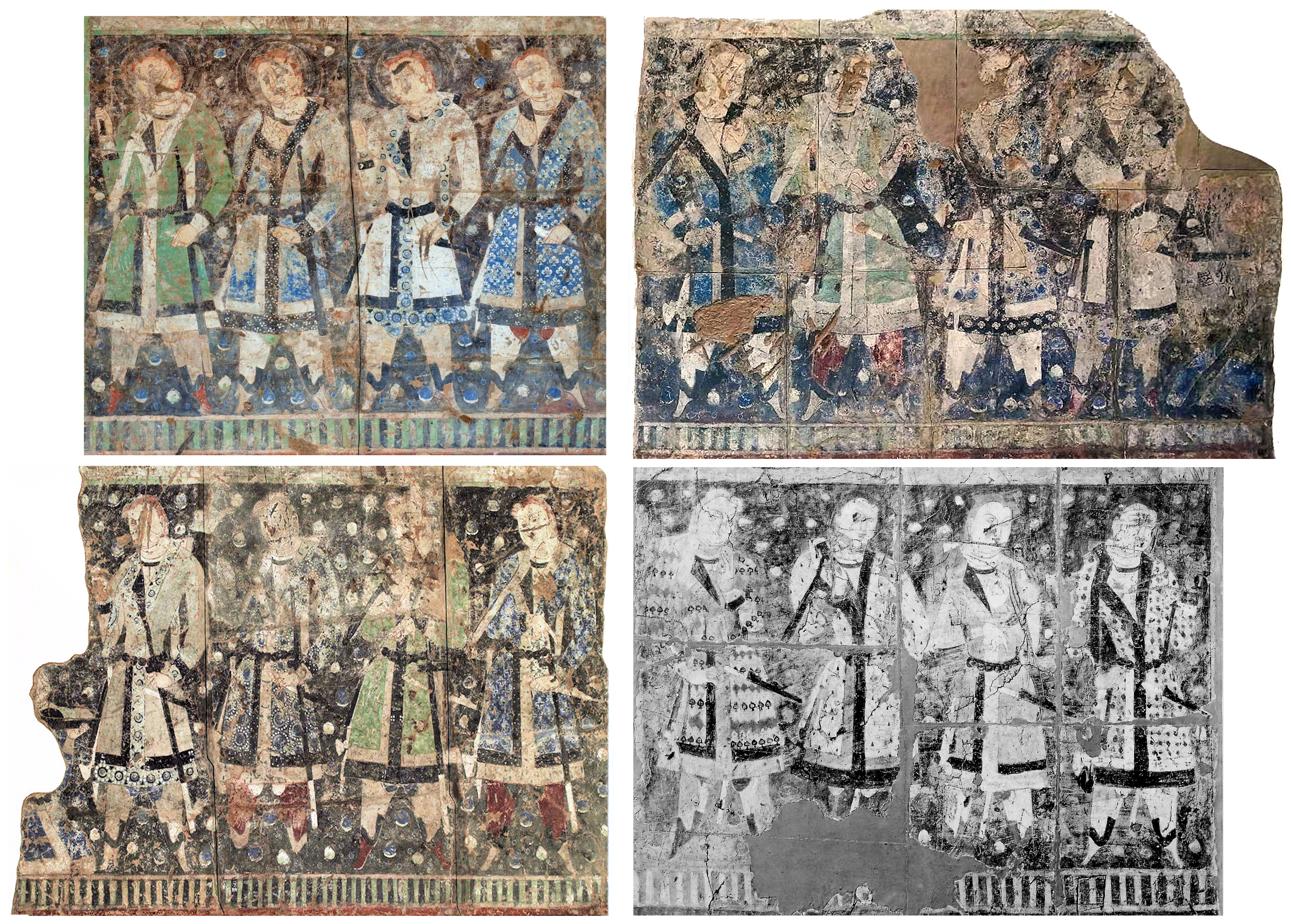
Sixteen swordsmen, Cave of the Sixteen Sword-Bearers, Kizil 8

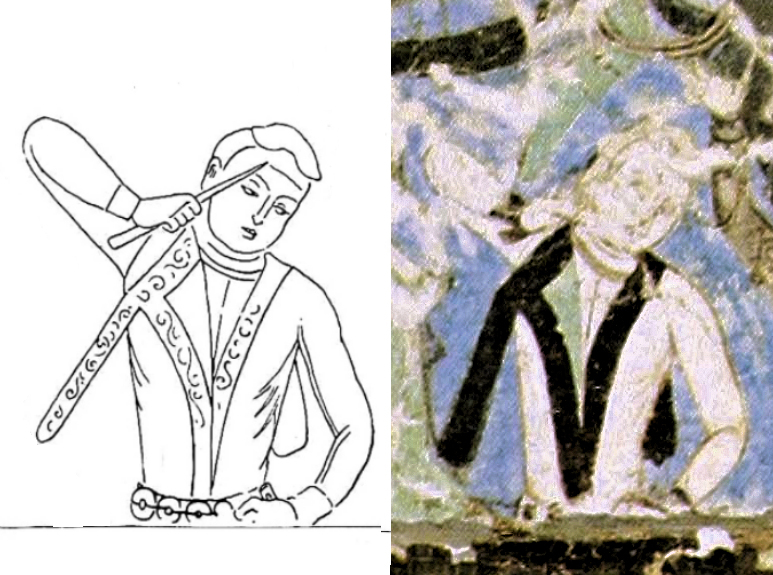
Tocharian prince, Maya Cave (group III), Kizil 224

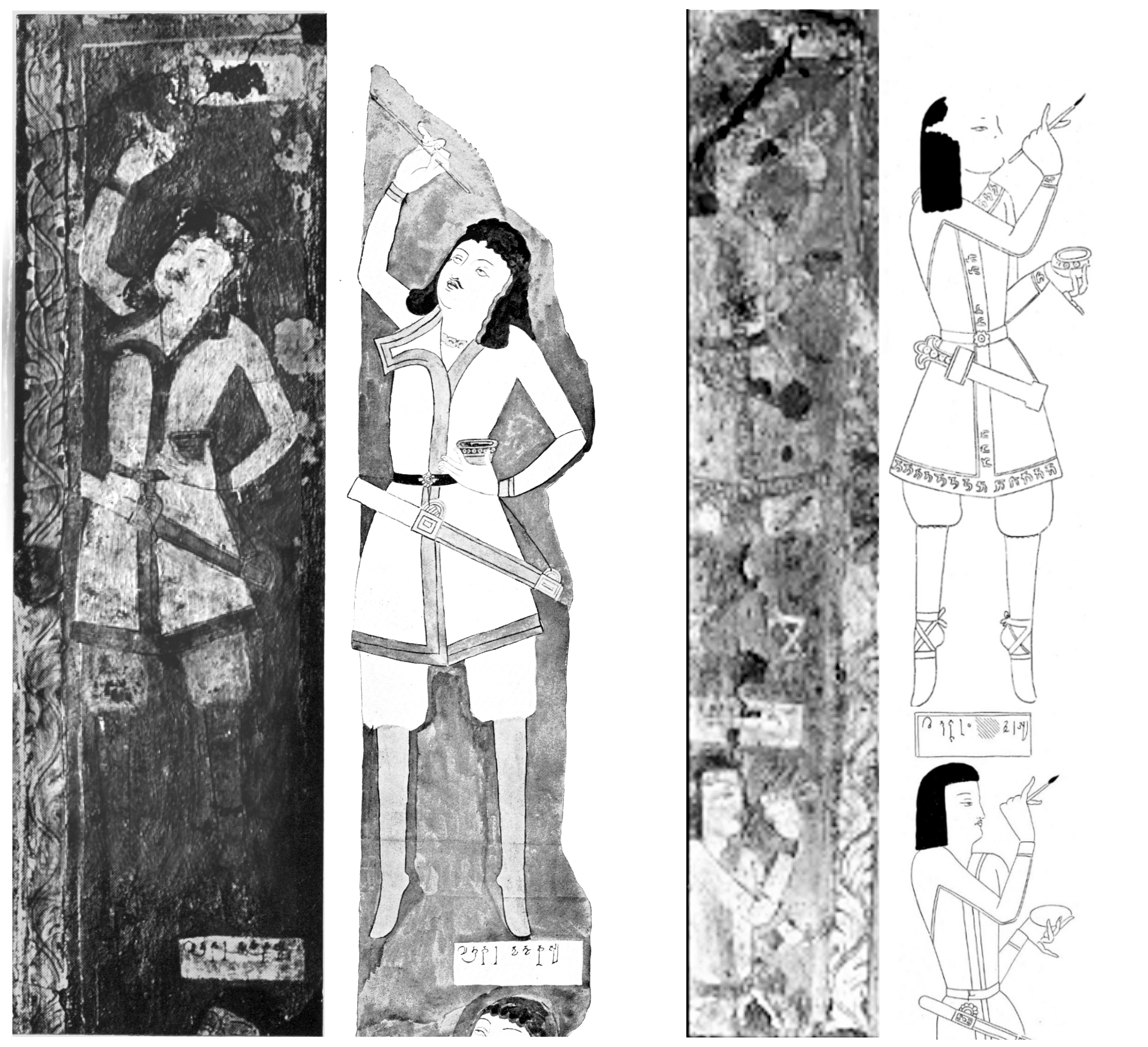
Painters wearing the so-called "East Sassanid costume", Cave of the Painters, Kizil 207

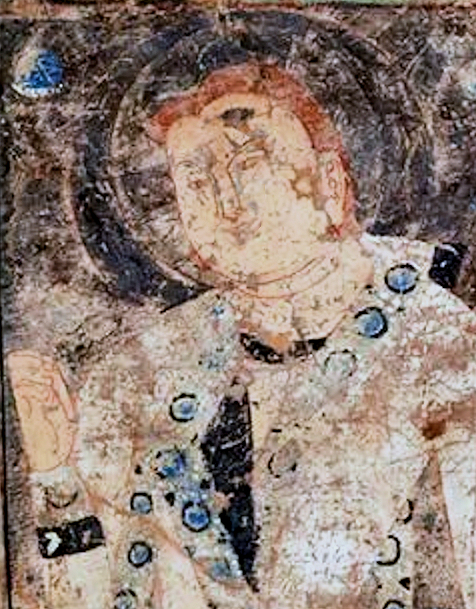
One of the sword-bearers, in right-lapelled caftan, Kizil.

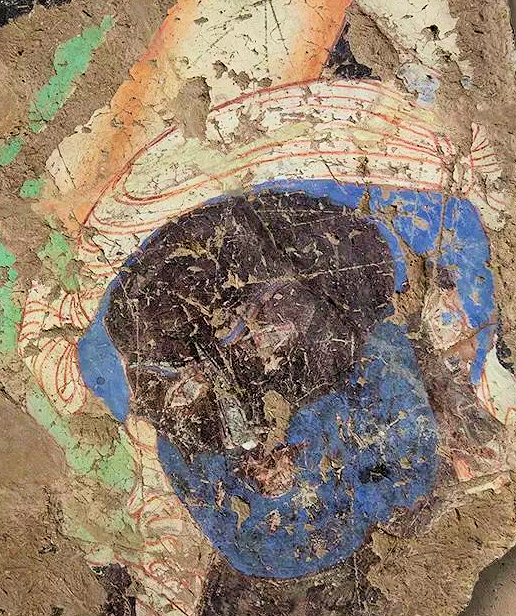
Man with a turban, from the side wall of the main cella, Kizil.

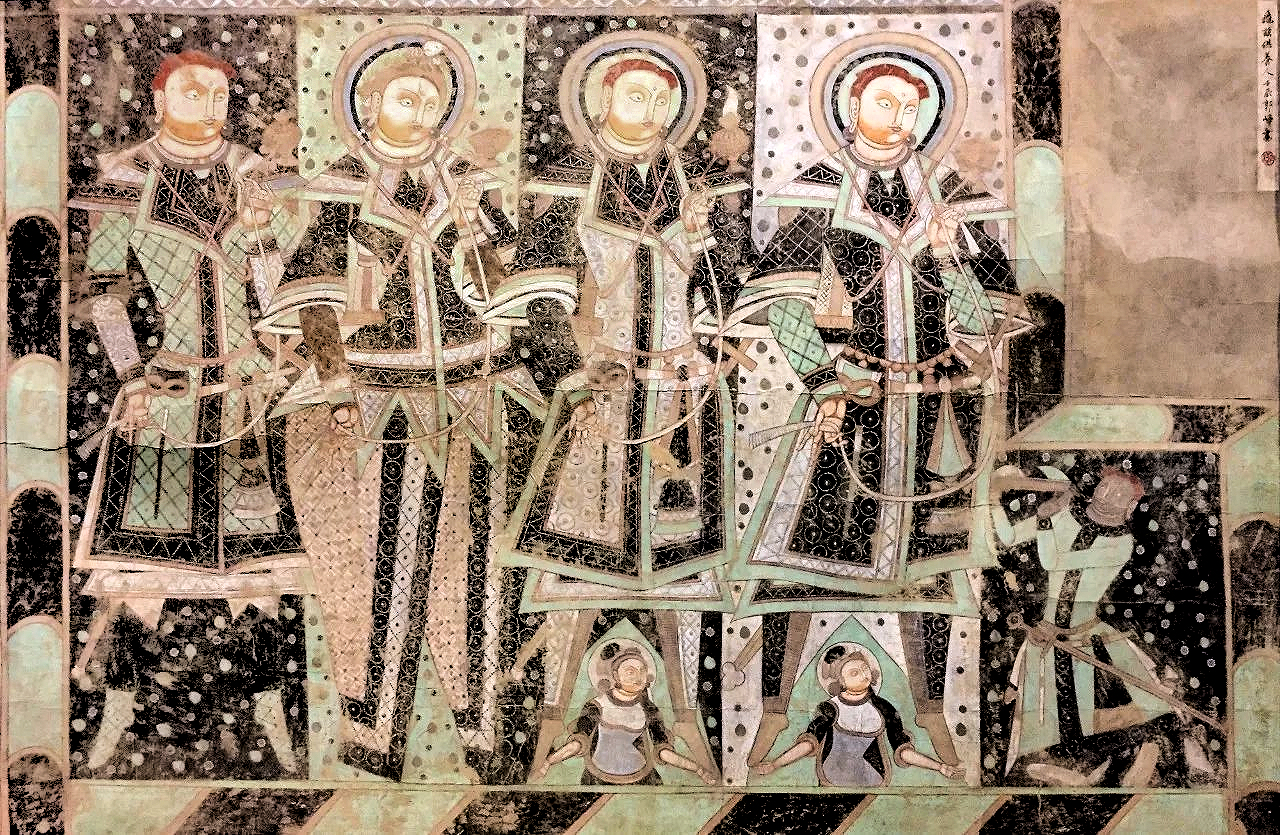
Tocharian donors, Kizilgaha Caves 14

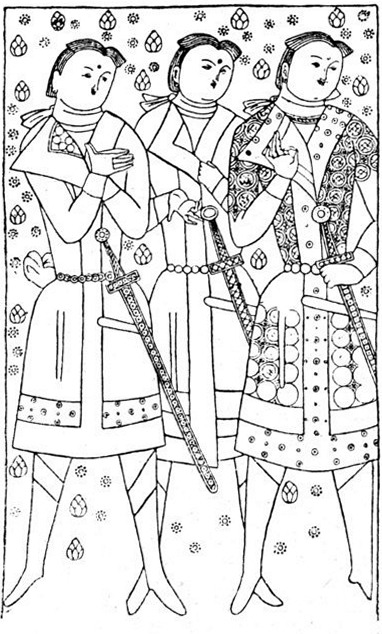
Tocharian donors, Kumtura Caves

== See also ==
- Byzantine dress
- Central Asian clothing
- Clothing in ancient Shu
- Parthian dress
- Saka clothing
- Scythian clothing
- Sogdian clothing
- Uyghur clothing
- Sampul tapestry
- Tocharian mummies
- Hephthalites
