= Clothing in ancient Shu =

Clothing of the Ancient Kingdom of Shu

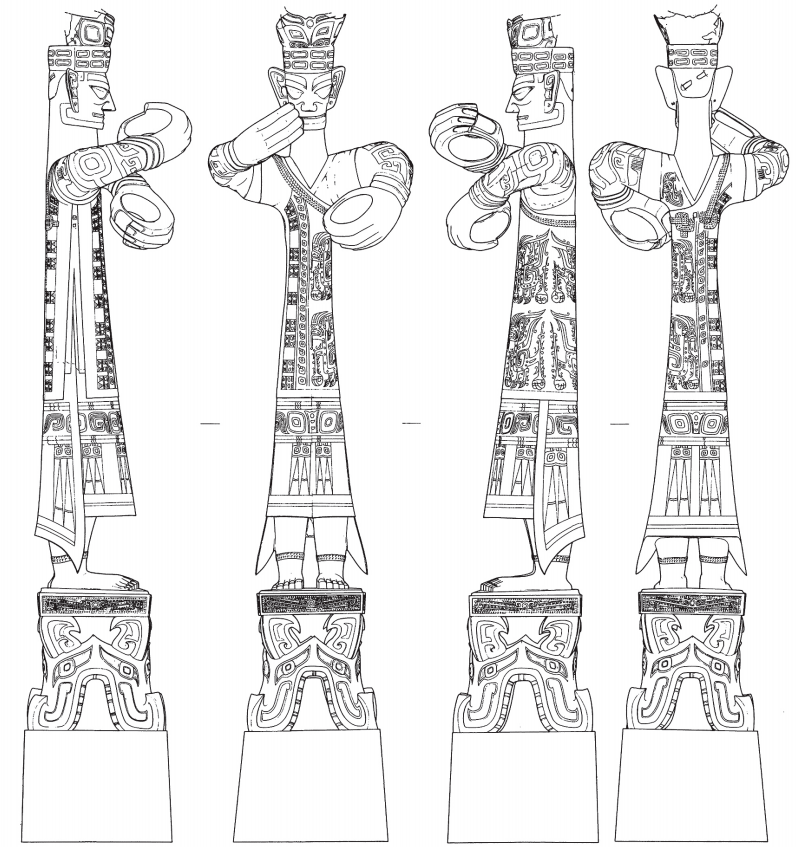
The large bronze figure uncovered at Sanxingdui, clothed in the so-called "royal dress". The figure has been interpreted as a representation of a high priest by Kimberley S. Te Winkle, and a priest-king of ancient Shu by Chinese archaeologists.

Clothing in ancient Shu refers to clothing worn in the Ancient Kingdom of Shu (1046 BC? – c. 316 BC, modern-day Chengdu Plain, Sichuan). Archaeological finds in Sanxingdui and Jinsha sites have provided the best source of information on ancient Shu costume. Shu clothing's right over left lapel closing (zuoren) was considered "very strange" by Yang Xiong, a 1st-century BC author from Pi County, Chengdu, as in contrast to contemporary Chinese Western Han clothing's left over right lapel closing (youren).

== Overview ==
The large bronze figure uncovered at Sanxingdui wears a crown-like headdress and three layers of robes of fancy design, which are referred to as the "royal dress" of ancient Shu by Chinese archaeologists. The outer garment with short sleeves is covered with intricately designed patterns of birds and mythical creatures. The middle garment is mostly hidden for being the shortest of the three, with its V-shaped neckline visible. The longest inner garment with tight long sleeves is partially visible from the back, which has a swallow-tailed hem.

The most common clothing worn by those bronze figures comprises a tight jacket, or a close-fitting, usually knee length tunic with a belt, and a pair of tight pants. The jackets are mostly plain and simple without decoration, while the tunics have linear geometric patterns, albeit much less intricate compared to the "royal dress". One exception is the jacket worn by a bronze figure with an animal-form headdress, decorated with motifs, according to Li Laiyu, resembling cloud and lightning.

== Gallery ==
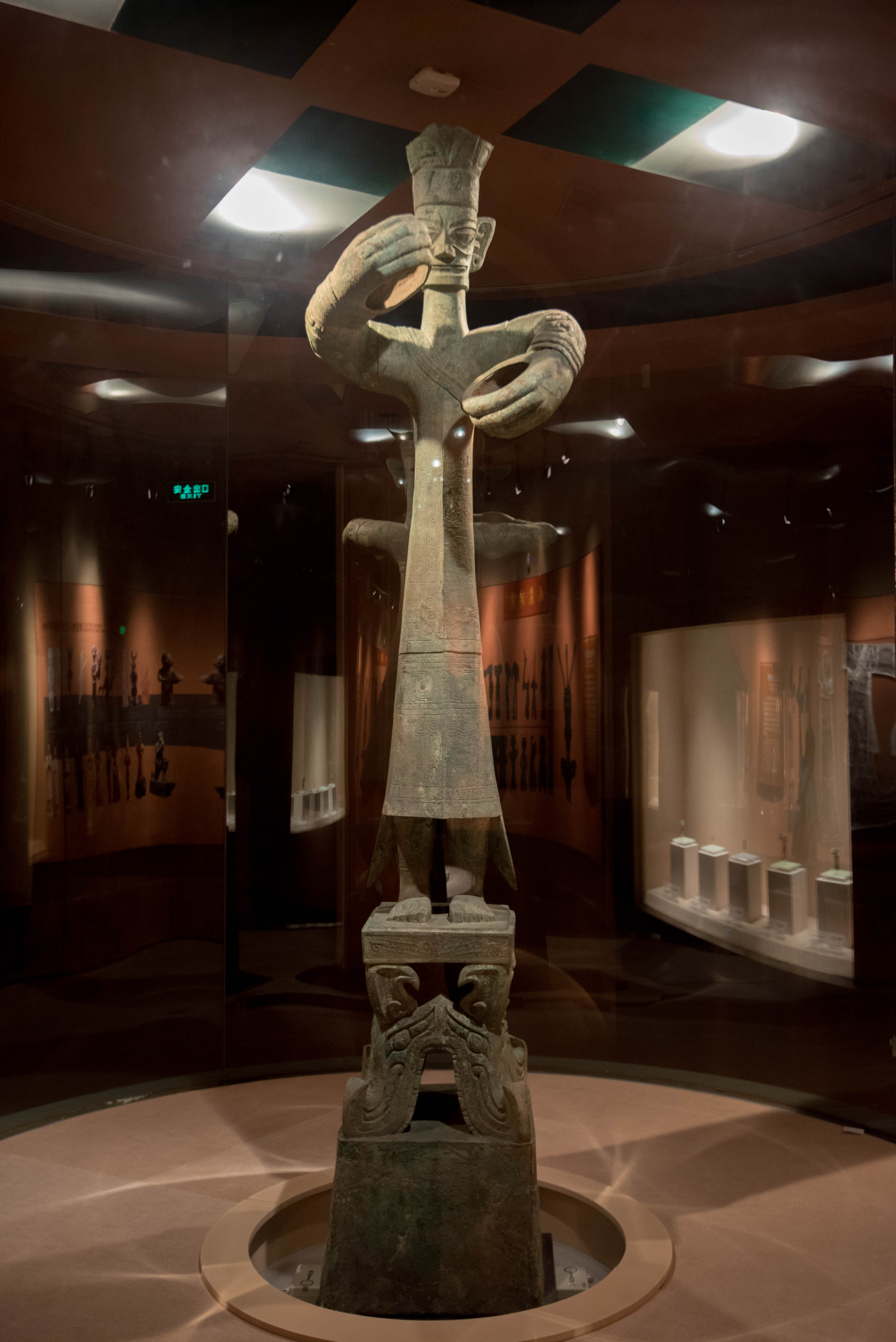
Large bronze figure from Sanxingdui

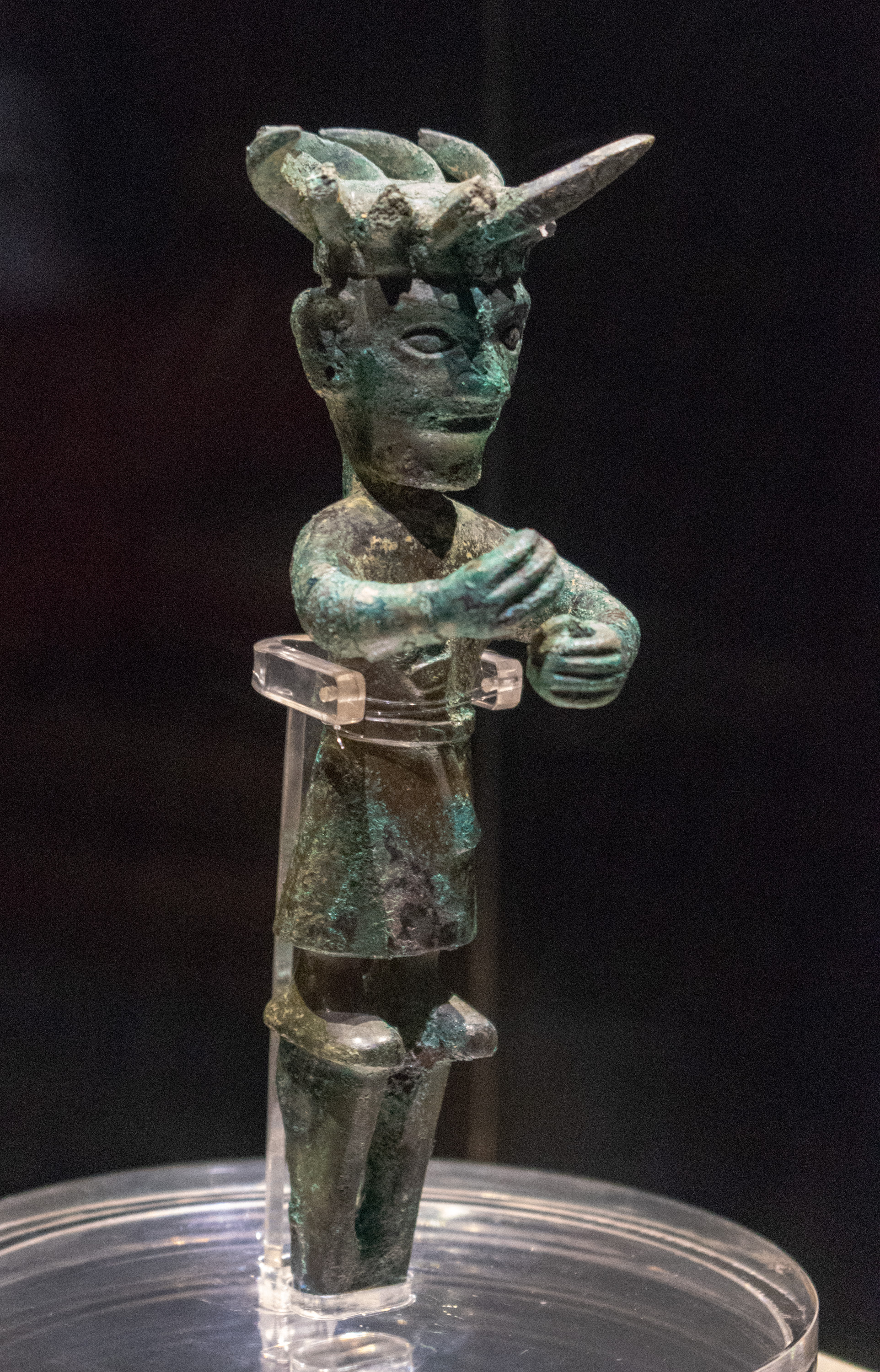
Bronze figurine from Jinsha

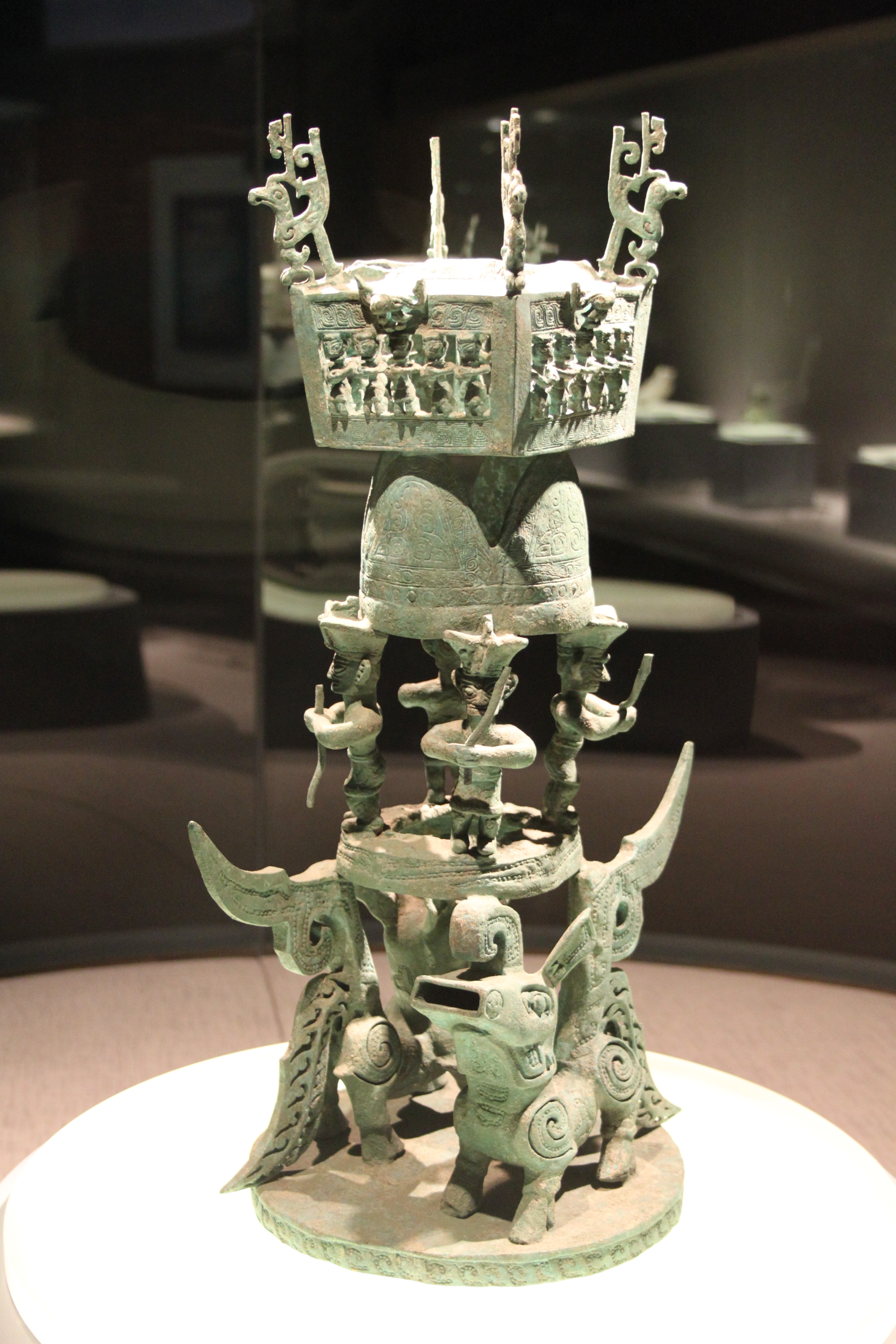
Bronze altar with male figures wearing belted tunics, Sanxingdui

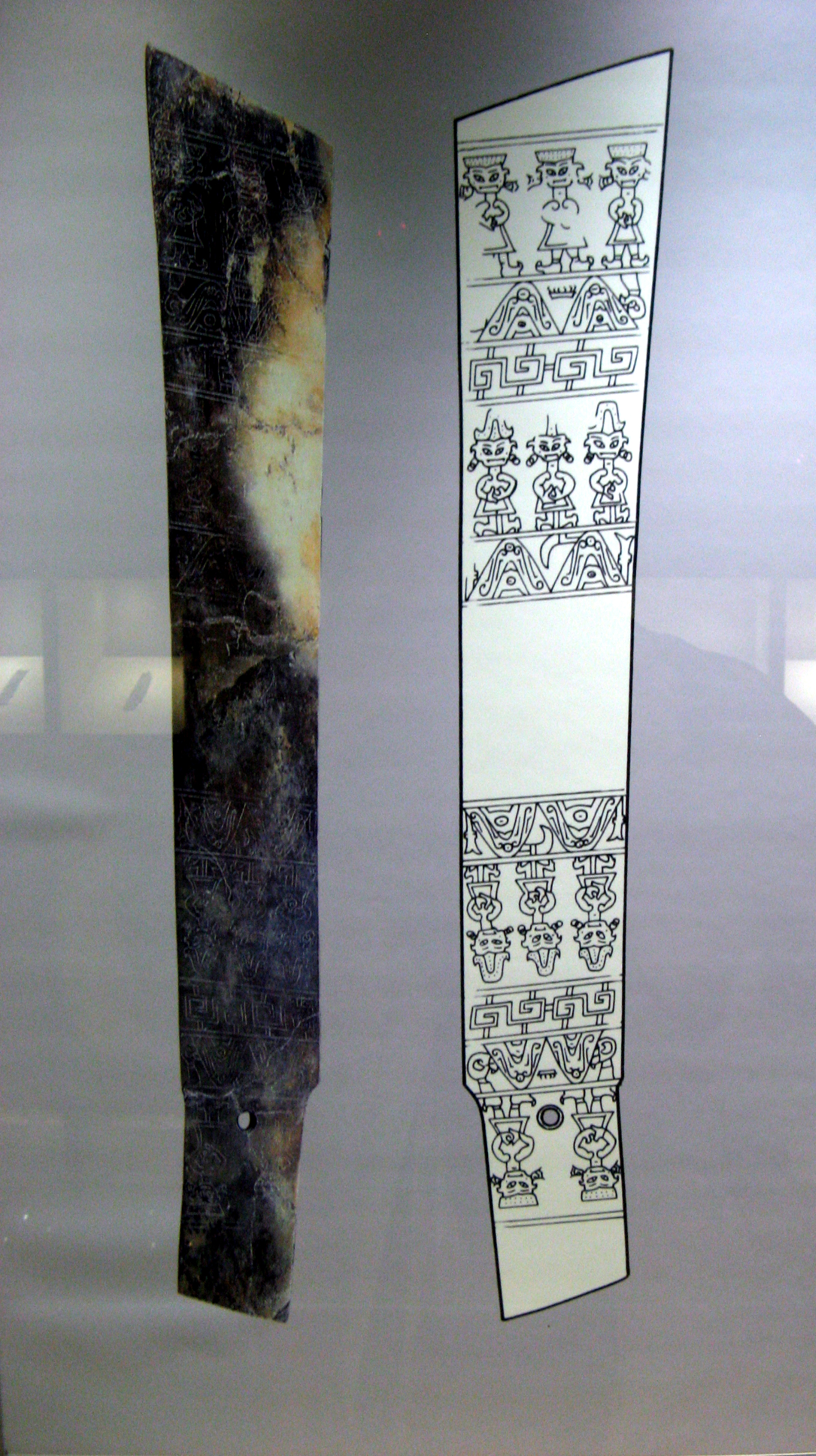
Female figures carved on jade blade, Sanxingdui

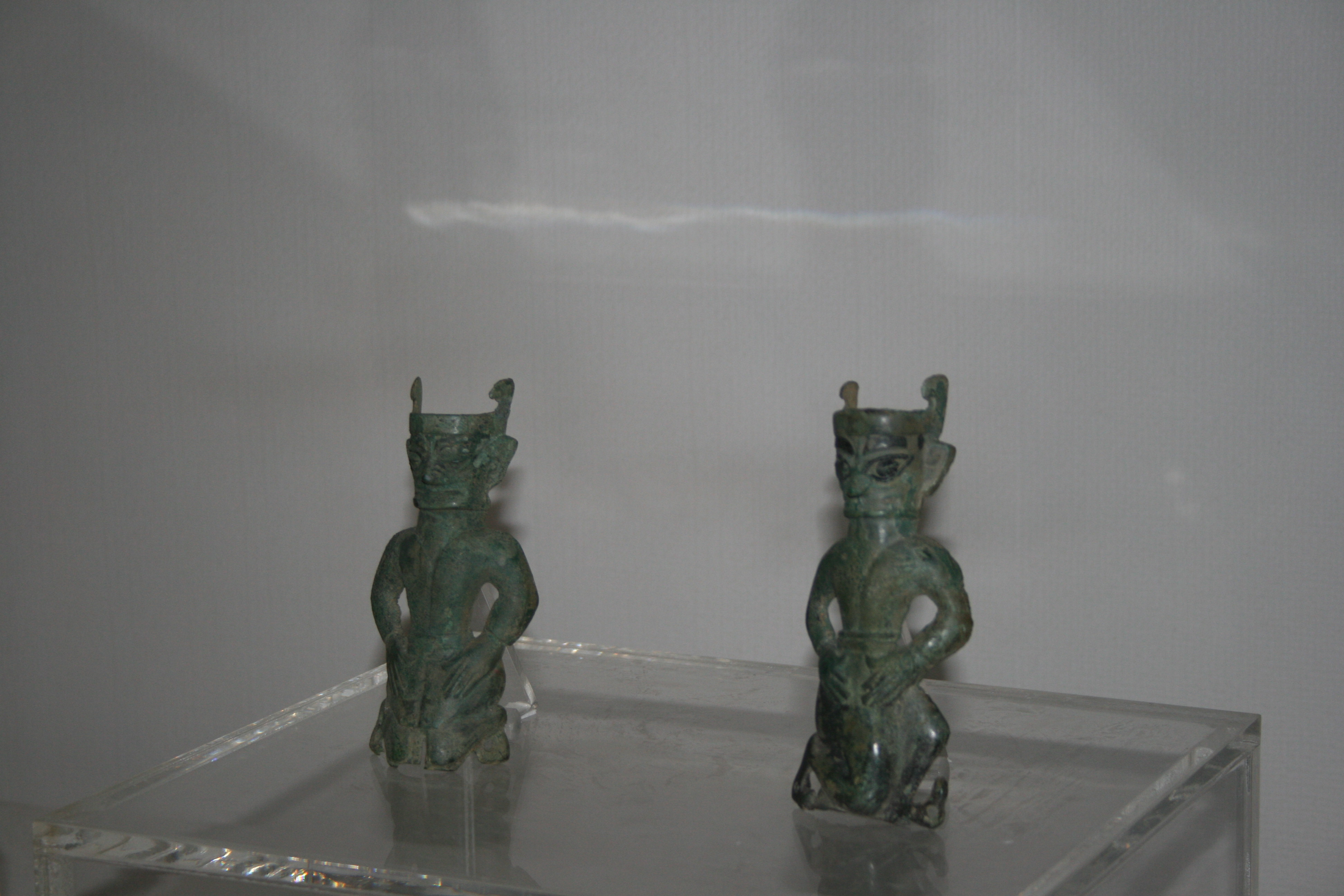
Bronze figurines wearing plain jackets and tight pants, Sanxingdui

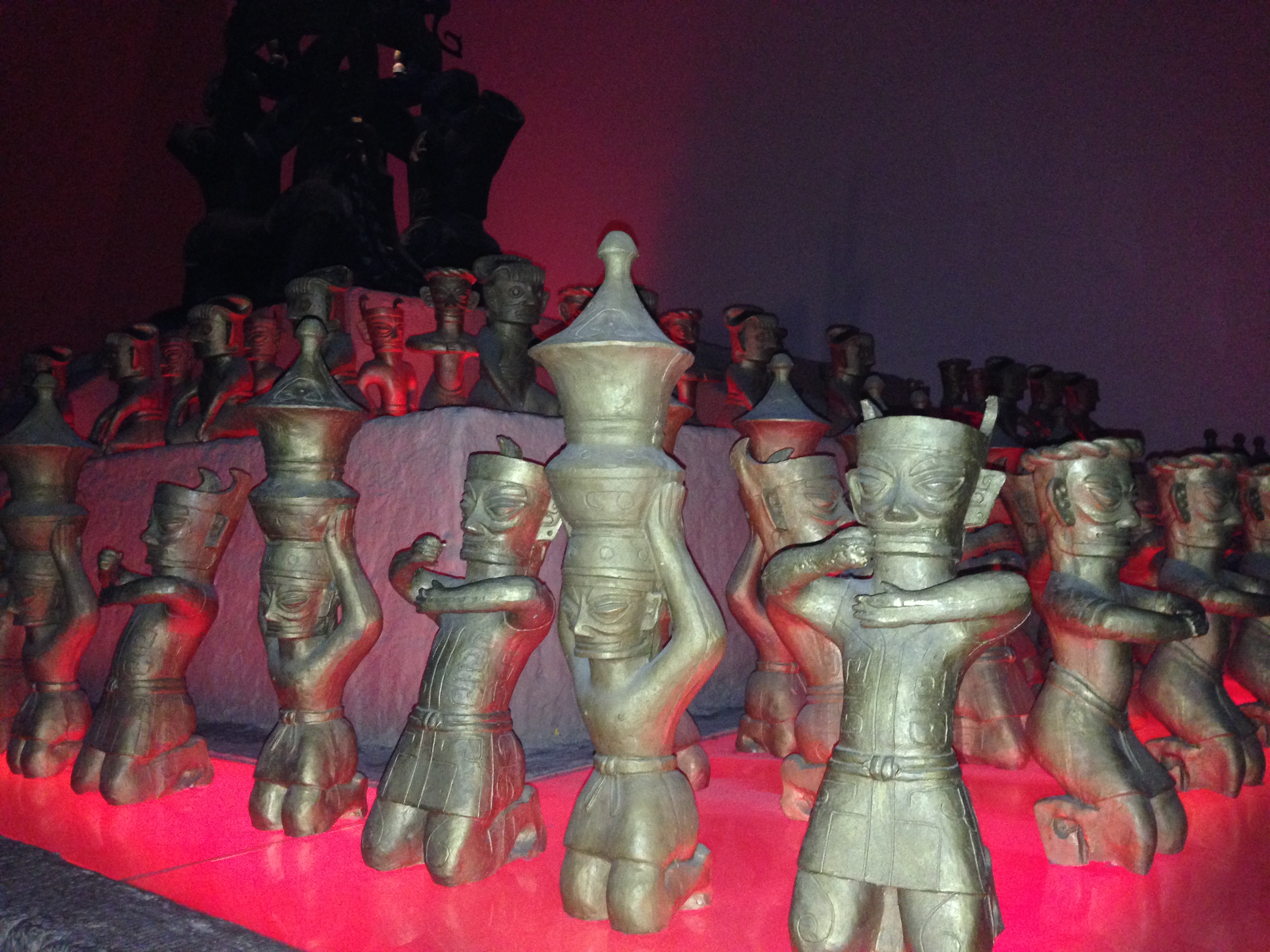
Bronze figurines wearing belted tunics, Sanxingdui

== See also ==
- Ba–Shu culture
- Clothing in the ancient world
- Sichuan Textiles ("Shu brocade")
- Tocharian clothing
