= Scythian metallurgy =

From the 7th to 3rd Century BC, the Scythian people of the Pontic–Caspian steppe engaged in the widespread practice of metallurgy. Though Scythian society was heavily based around a nomadic, mobile lifestyle, the culture was capable of practicing metallurgy and of producing metal objects. Many works of Scythian metalworking have subsequently been found throughout the range of the people.

Iron Scythian acinaces from the 7th-5th century BC

== Description ==
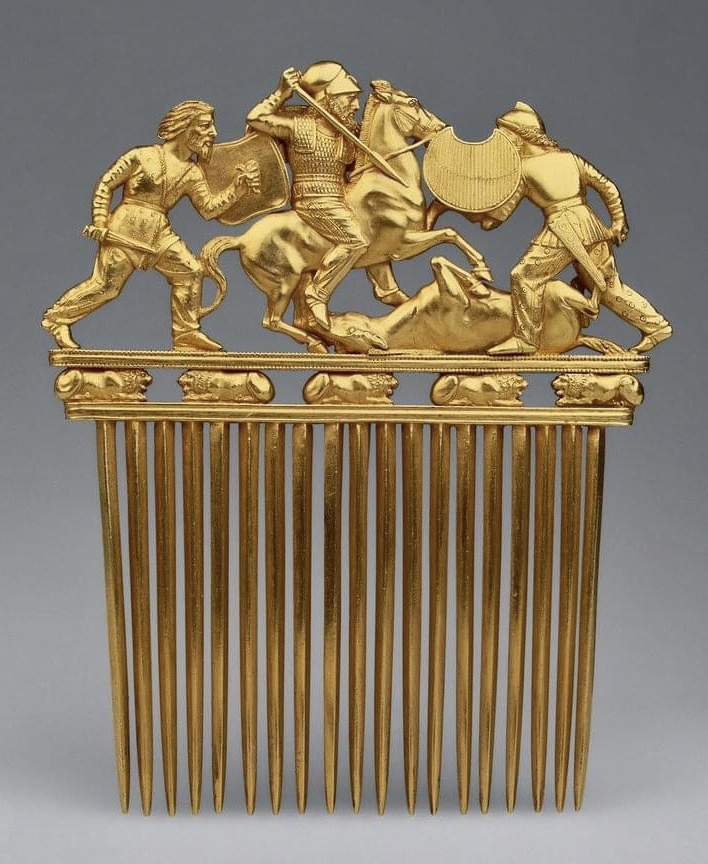
Scythian comb dated to the 4th Century BC

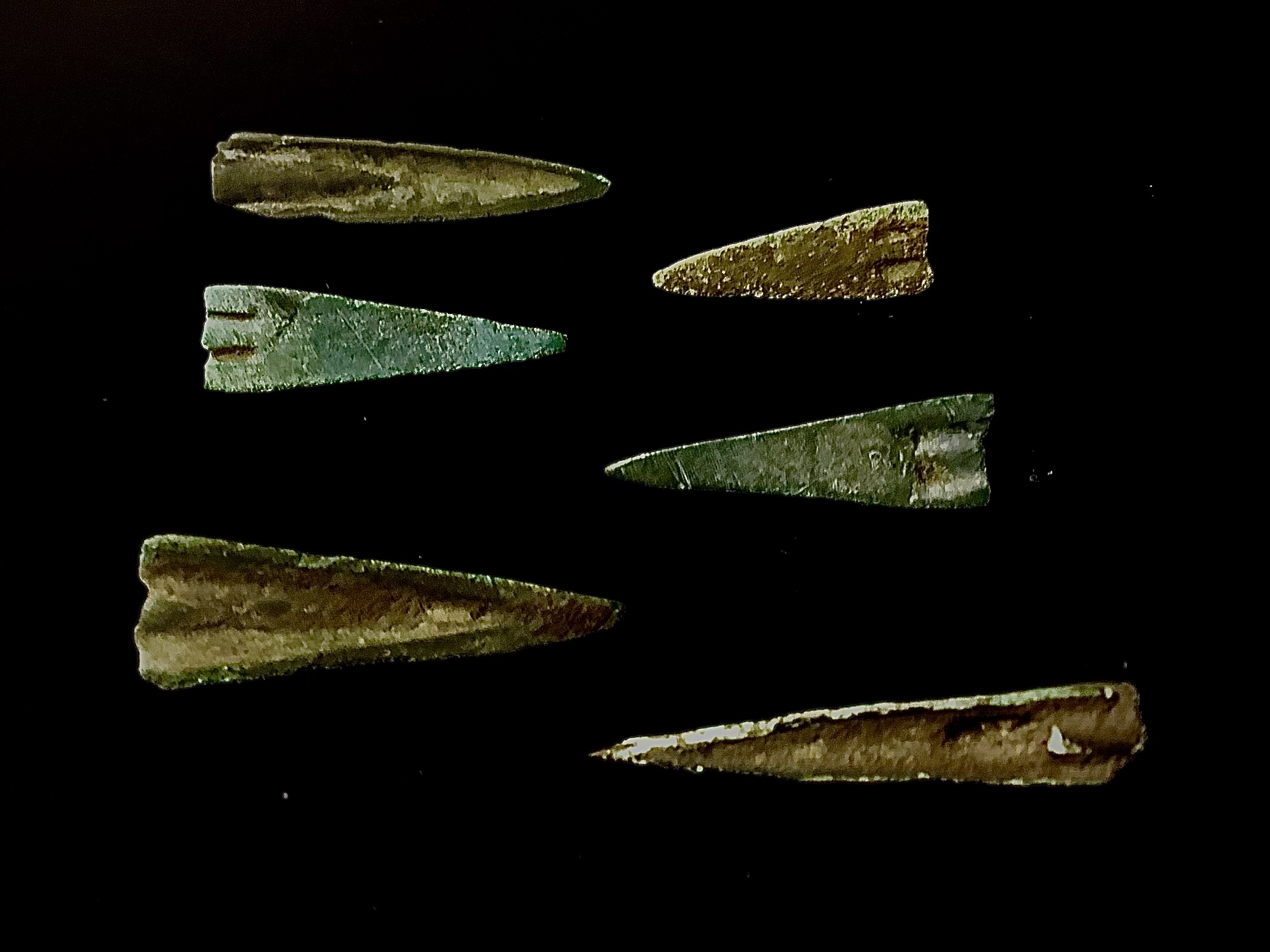
Scythian forged bronze arrowheads, c700-300 BC

The Scythians emerged as a people prior to the 7th Century BC, when they were first mentioned in historical records. The Scythian civilization consisted of a number of distinct tribal groups scattered across the Pontic Steppes, Caucasus, and Central Asia. Though primarily a nomadic people, the Scythians established a number of settlements across their territory; these establishments in turn allowed for the development of a sedentary society and the accompanying development of trade skills, including metalworking.

Scythian knowledge of metalworking likely originated with the peoples of Iran and China, with this knowledge spreading along trade routes and arriving in the steppes from the 2nd to 1st Millennium BC. Early Scythian metallurgy was centered around bronzeworking, as these skills had already been widely adopted by the Scythians' neighbors. The Minusinsk Basin of Siberia has been speculated as the origin point for the raw materials used in Bronze-age Scythian metallurgy, and Scythian access to this region fueled the peoples' later centuries of expansion. During the 8th Century BC Scythians were often employed by nations in the Near East and these returning soldiers may have brought knowledge of iron-working back to their homeland, and by the start of the 6th-century BC the practice was widespread in the Pontic steppes. In addition to bronze and iron working, gold and copper-working were also present in Scythian society; in his commentary on the Scythian people, Greek historian Herodotus remarked on their fondness for making things from gold and copper. Metallurgy held a major place in Scythian society as metalworkers were needed to produce material goods to support the Scythian way of life. As a nomadic society with broad borders, the Scythians often raided neighboring peoples and as such required metal weaponry - particularly iron swords and bronze arrowheads. It has been speculated that the Scythian's use of stylized metal adornments may have been copied from their opponents during these conflicts. In addition, jewelry and other adornment was in demand among all classes of society, as can be seen with the discovery of metal adornments in the burial tombs attributed to the Scythians. One notable aspect of Scythian clothing was the widespread use of metal belts.

Other signs of Scythian metalworking can be found throughout sites attributed to the people. Several notable Scythian archeological sites contain the remnants of metalworking operations; at one settlement along the Dnieper, remnants of blast furnaces and slag have been found, implying the existence of a large metallurgical center. Studies of other Scythian sites have also led to the remains of metal workshops and tools being found, further supporting the theory that the Scythians were organized craftspeople. Scythian metalworkers were particularly renowned for the high quality of their copper crafting. During war, portable molds were brought to forge arrowheads for the Scythian cavalry. Scythian metallurgy also influenced the metallurgy of the Koban people of the North Caucasus.

== See also ==
- Scythian art
- Scythian clothing
