= Scythian clothing =

Clothing of the Scythian people

From the 7th to the 3rd century BC, the Scythian people of the Pontic Steppes produced and adopted a wide arrangement of clothing. The clothing of the Scythians was formulated in response to the nomadic, highly mobile lifestyle of the early Scythian era and the sedentary lifestyle of later Scythian kingdoms. Much of what is known about Scythian attire comes from the remains of clothing found in Scythian burial sites.

== Description ==
Kul-Oba vase
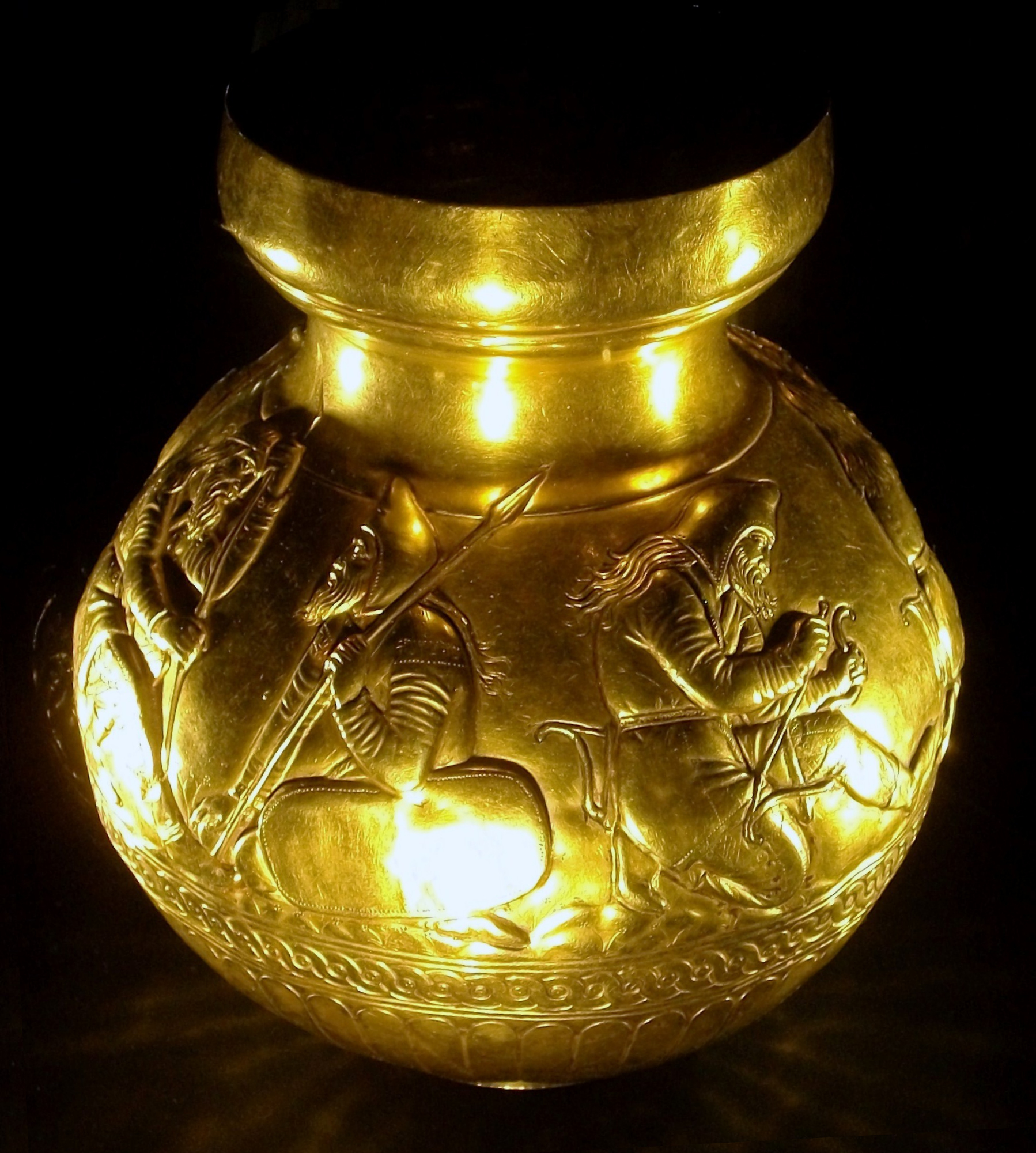
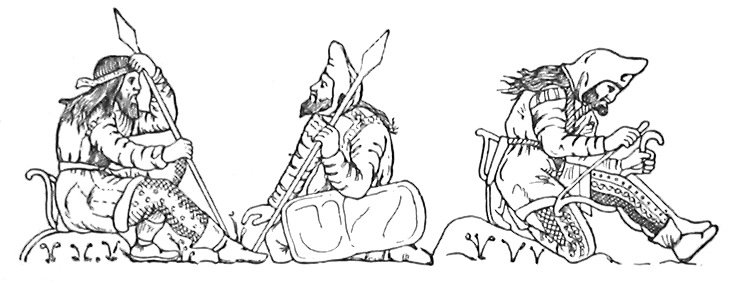
Scythian warriors, drawn after figures on an electrum cup from the Kul-Oba kurgan burial near Kerch, Crimea. The warrior on the right strings his bow, bracing it behind his knee; note the typical pointed hood, long jacket with fur or fleece trimming at the edges, decorated trousers, and short boots tied at the ankle. Scythians apparently wore their hair long and loose, and all adult men apparently bearded. The gorytos appears clearly on the right hip of the bare-headed spearman. The shield of the central figure may be made of plain leather over a wooden or wicker base. (Hermitage Museum, St Petersburg).

Emerging as a people in the early centuries of the first millennium BC, the Scythian civilization consisted of a varied group of nomadic peoples in the Pontic Steppes, the Northern Caucasus, and the plains of Central Asia. Over time, the Scythians developed a generalized style of clothing, while specific branches of the people developed more specialized costumes as they interacted with neighboring peoples. Most of what is known about the clothing of the Scythians is gleaned from objects recovered from Scythian burial sites and as such this information almost always relates to the attire of wealthier Scythians.

A primarily nomadic people who based their lifestyle around trade, herding, and horsemanship, clothing attributed to the early Scythian era is speculated to have primarily been both utilitarian and decorative. An account by the Greek historian Herodotus noted that Scythian warriors who fought for the Persian Empire in the 5th century BC noted that they wore tall pointed hats (Persian art depicting Scythians also included pointed hats), while Greek pottery depicts Scythian warriors wearing trousers and long-sleeved jackets fastened with strips of cloth or leather. Other Greek art depicts Scythians wearing the generic clothing Greek artists used symbolizes most peoples of the Near East. The Scythians themselves created art depicting their culture's clothing; Scythian self depiction focused heavily on clothing used by Scythian warriors, such as armor. Stone sculptures attributed to the Scythians depict Scythians wearing armor of various quality, bracelets, tunics and kaftans. Some art depicts Scythians as wearing narrow-laced boots around their ankles and feet.

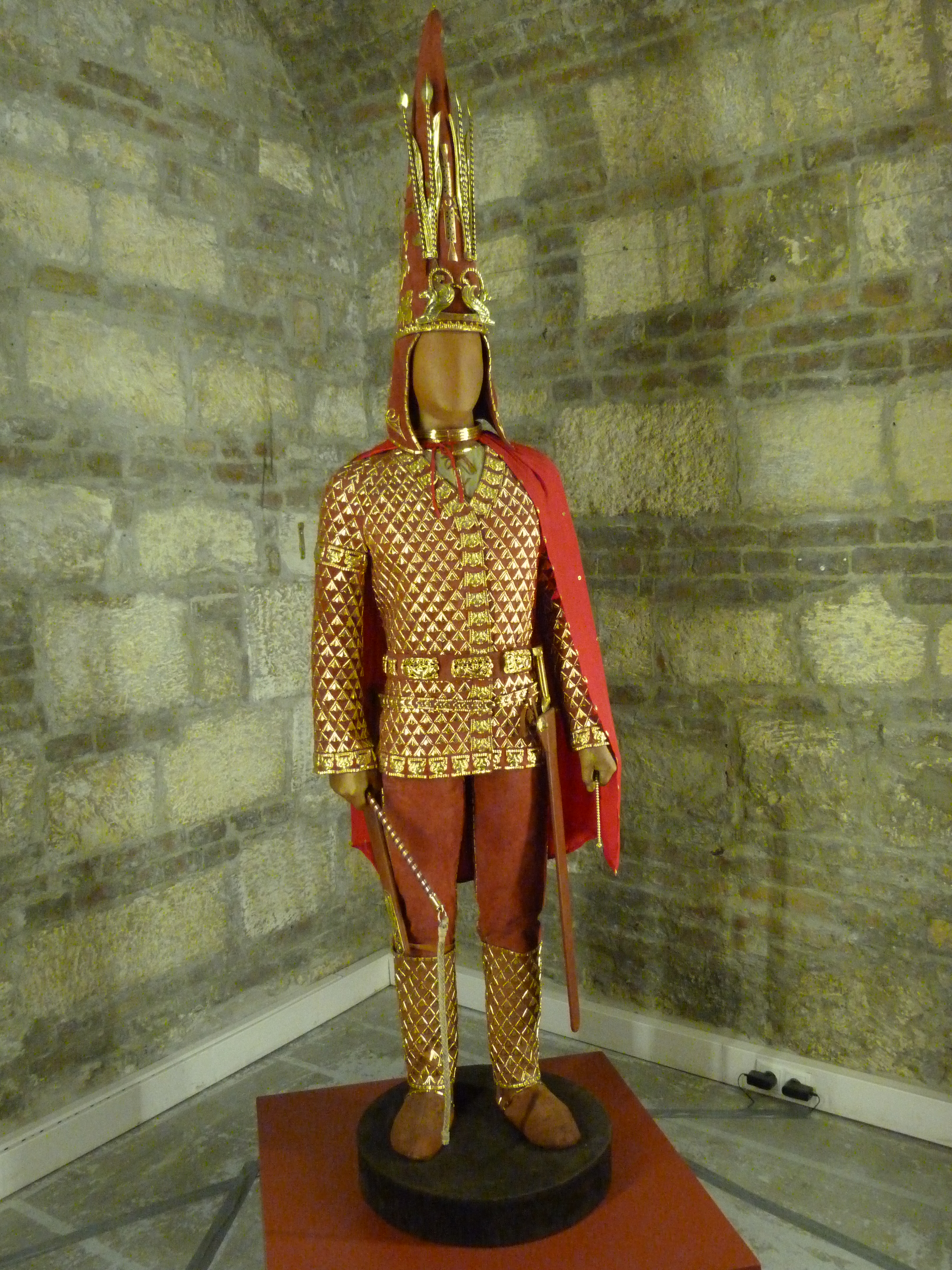
The "Armor of the Golden Man", a reconstructed suit of Scythian armor dating to the 3rd-4th Century BCE

As the Scythians grew in power and became better established in the 5th century BC, they began to increasingly establish permanent communities in their territory. This adoption of a more sedentary lifestyle allowed for advanced trade skills to form within Scythian society, such as tailoring. Depictions of later Scythian clothing show people wearing fur-lined jackets, simpler articles of clothing (consisting of a single cloth piece draped and pinned over the body), long robes, and a type of tunic with sewed sleeves. Remnants of cloth found in Scythian burial sites shows that Scythian tailors worked with wool, hemp, ramie, and various other fibers. Though the remains of looms have been found, it is debated how much of the cloth used by Scythians was produced domestically or imported. Embroidery is speculated to have been used to decorate robes and kaftans, as was fur trim. Art produced by peoples bordering the Black Sea, who often traded and warred with the Scythians, depicts some Scythian clothing as being designed with loose flaps able to move during horseback riding. Some aspects of Scythian clothing were heavily influenced by the culture of the peoples they bordered, traded with, or raided.

Scythian women wore armor, loose pants, and were often depicted with bows and arrows. Scythian women fought, hunted, rode horses, used bows and arrows, just like the men. In one-third of the ancient Scythian burial mounds, women have weapons and war injuries just like the men. They also buried the women with knives and daggers and tools. It is now believed that the Greek myths of the Amazons were actually Scythian warrior women. Scythian women were highly skilled horseback archers and many depictions of women show them wearing trousers and holding a bow with a container used to carry arrows tied around their waist. Both men and women wore similar clothing since it was necessary and practical for their nomadic lifestyle.

One notable aspect of Scythian clothing was the usage of metal plates as a form of adornment. As people who placed great importance in metallurgy, Scythian metalsmiths became known for their forging of metal plates, buckles, and jewelry. These pieces of metalwork were made from gold, copper, and were worn on belts, on headwear, and on shoes. Scythian copperwork was particularly renowned for its quality. In his writings on the Scythian people, Herodotus noted that the Scythians were fond of decorating themselves with metal plates. It has been speculated that the Scythians adopted the practice of wearing metal plates from peoples who they raided in the Near East and then later expanded upon to form a unique Scythian style. Many higher quality plates were crafted to show stylized depictions of animals, a motif common in Scythian art. More utilitarian belts included loops on which weapons or tools would have been hung.

== See also ==
- Central Asian clothing
- Saka clothing
- Scythian art
- Scythian metallurgy
- Sogdian clothing
- Tocharian clothing

== Gallery ==
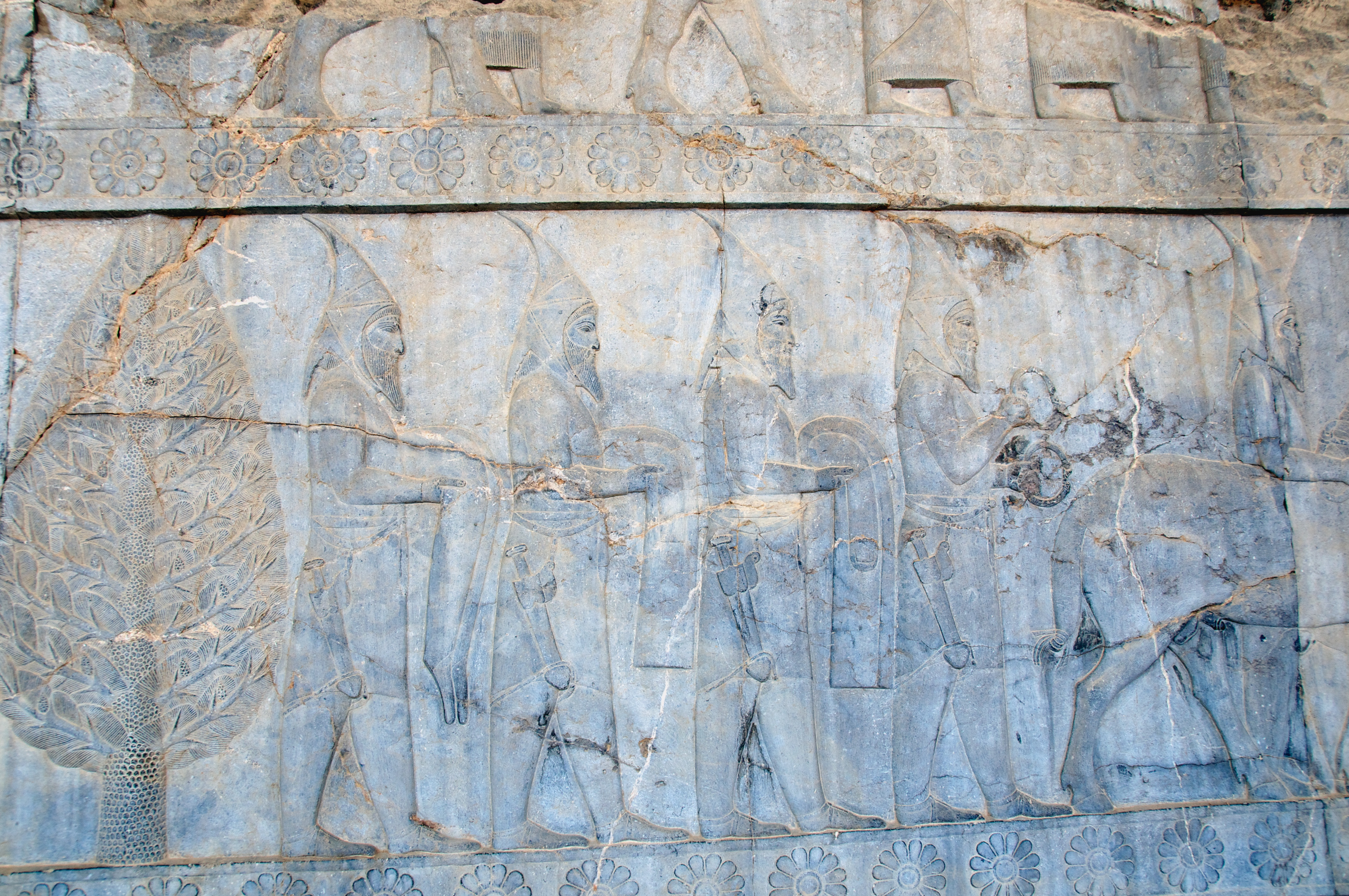
Scythian Tribute Bearers on the Apadana Staircase.

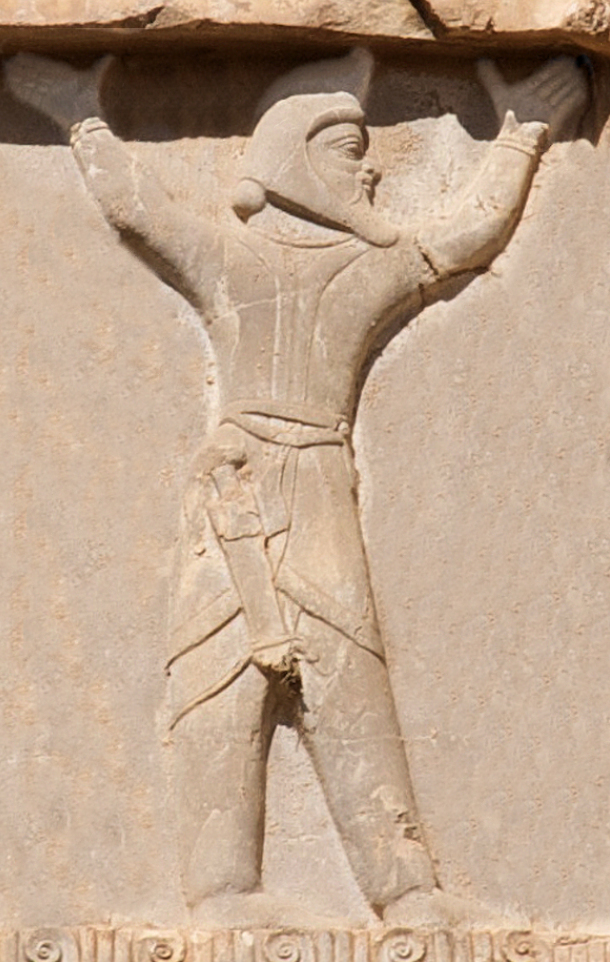
Eastern Scythian on the tomb of Xerxes I.

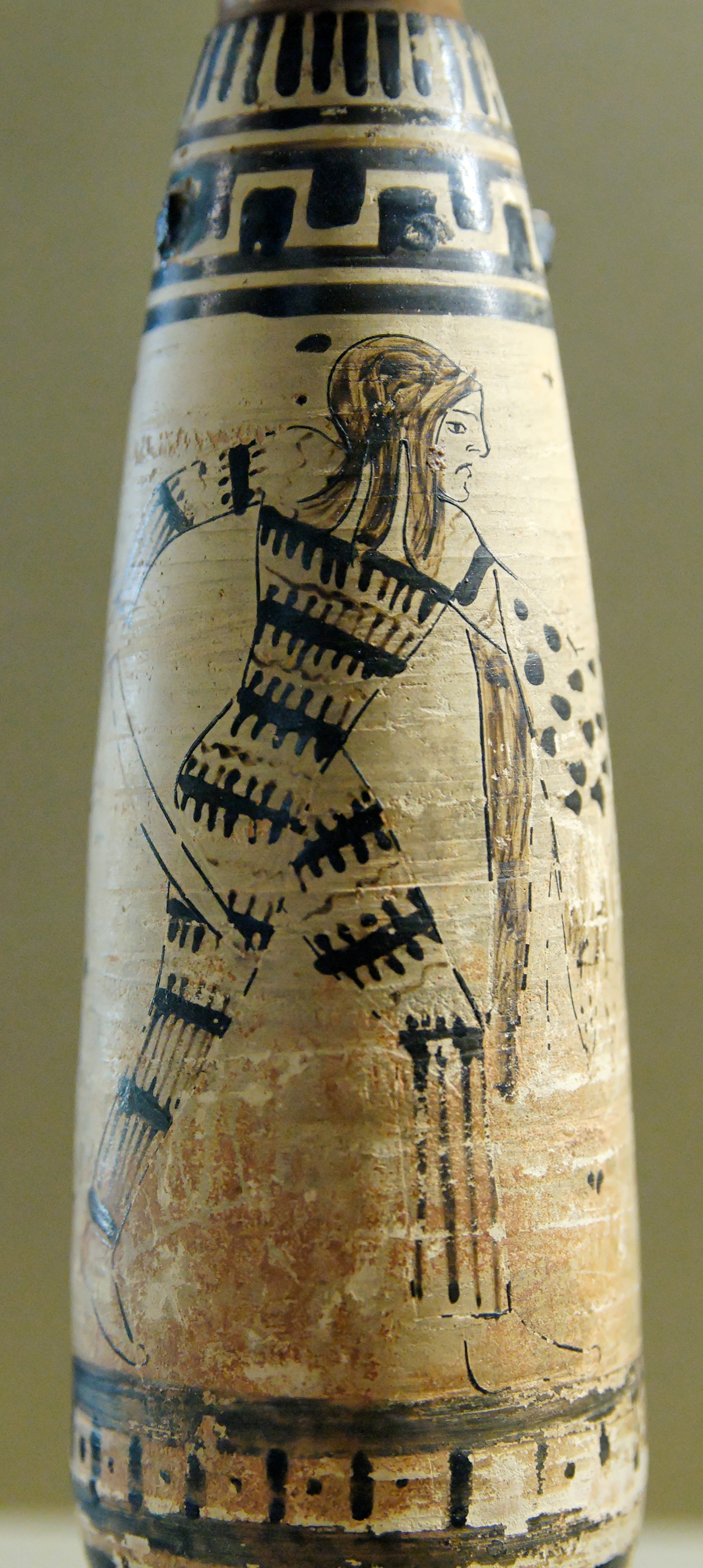
Scythian warrior, 490-480 BC, from Athens.

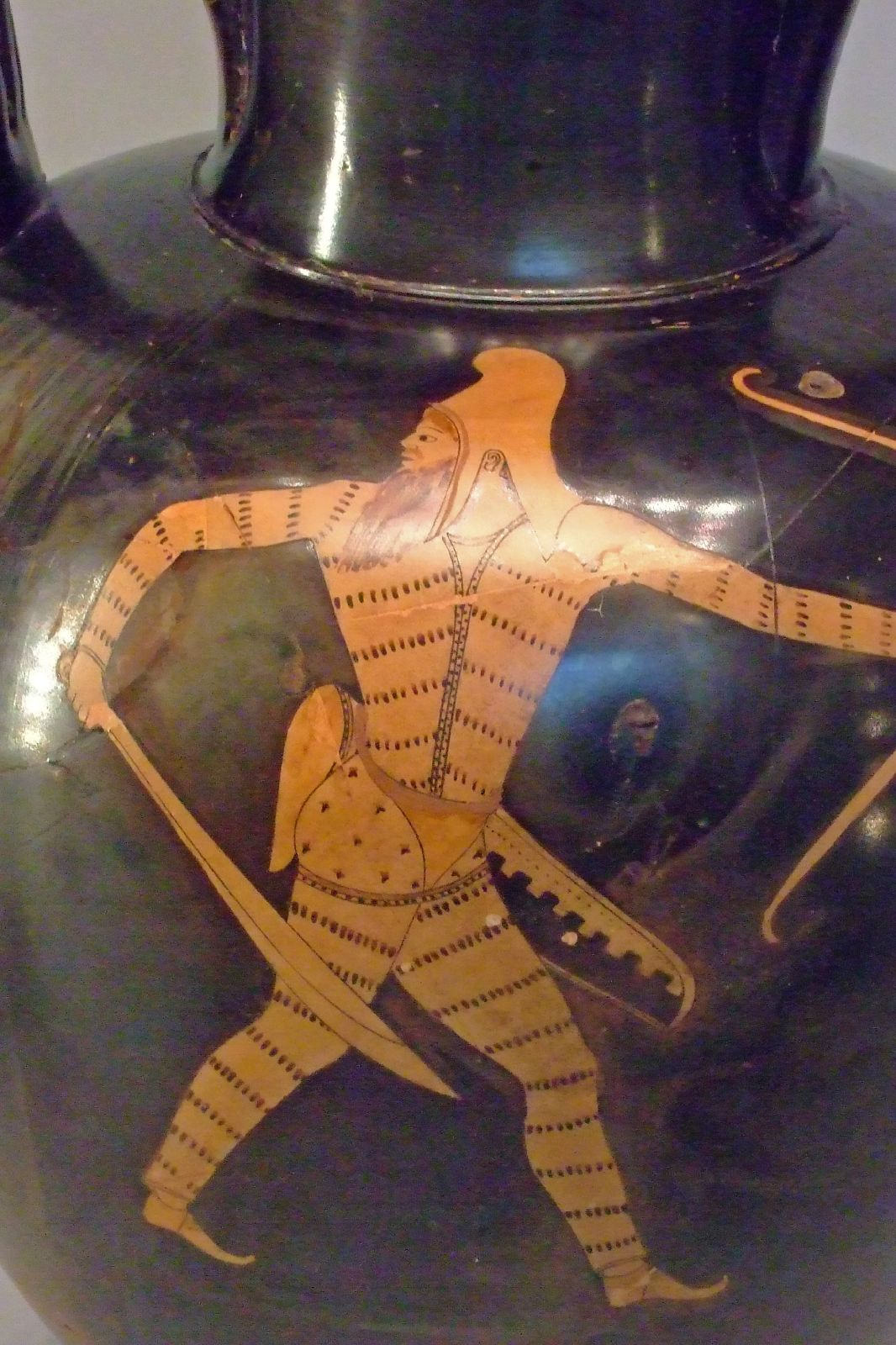
Red-figured amphora with a Scythian Warrior attributed to the Berlin Painter Greek made in Athens 480-470 BCE.

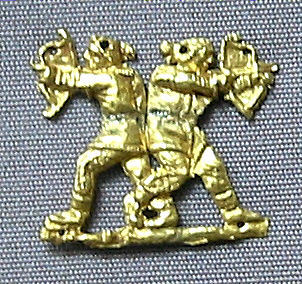
Gold sew-on clothing appliqué in the form of two Scythian Archers. 350-400 BCE. Probably from the Hill of Ashes, Crimea. British Museum collection.
