= Kediyu =

Western Indian garment

The kediyu is a garment worn by men in the rural coastal parts of western Gujarat, including Junagadh district. The kediyu is a long sleeved upper garment, pleated at the chest, which reaches to the waist. The prints on the kediyu include bandhani designs which are local to Gujarat and Rajasthan. The kediyu is often worn with chorno, also called kafni, which refers to the pantaloons that are wide and tied loosely at the ankles, and is based on the styles worn in Iraq which were introduced to the coastal region during the 7th century by traders. The chorno/surwal can also be worn with a jama also called peran.

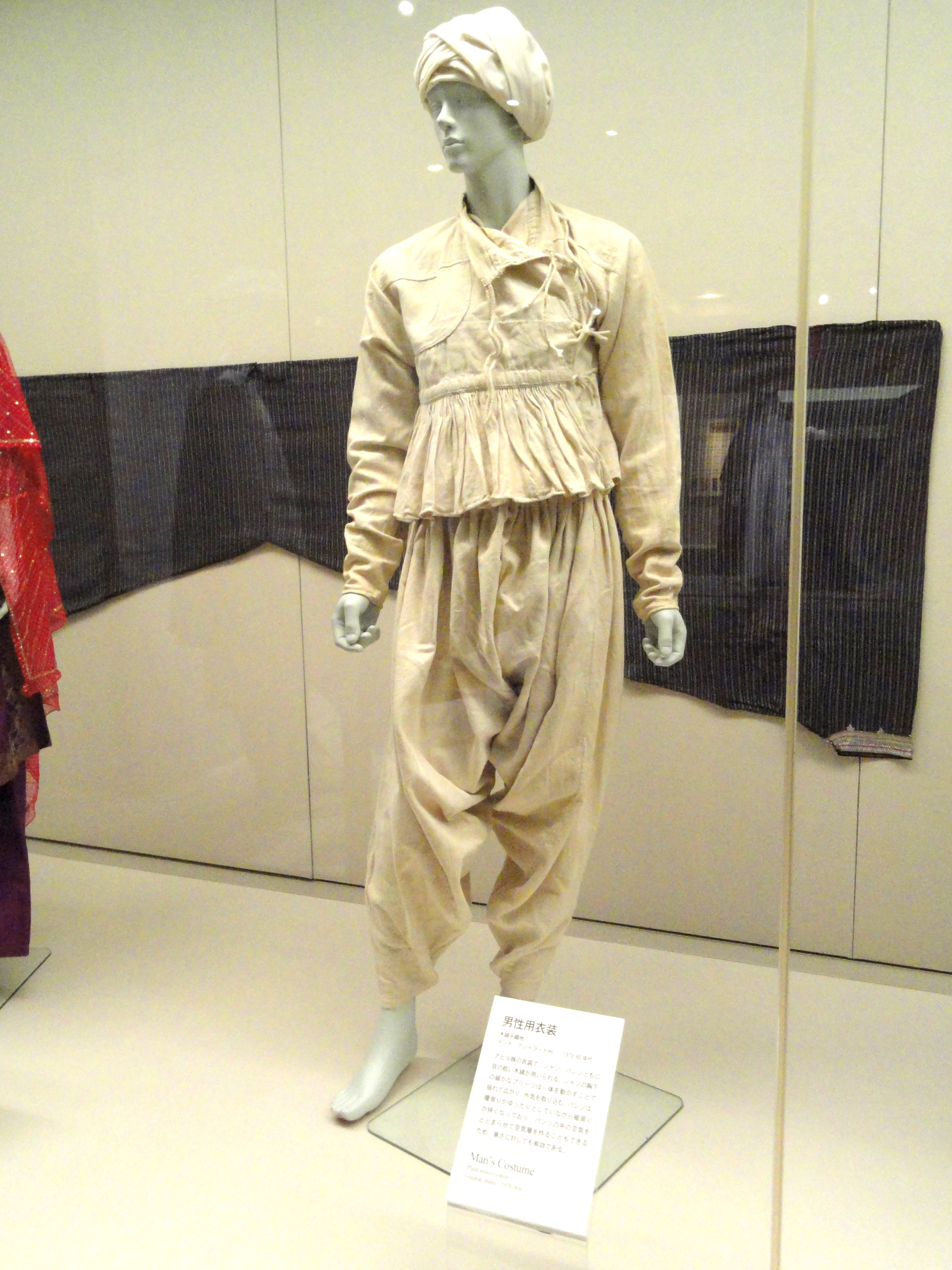
India (Gujarat), man's kediyu suruwal, Bunka Gakuen Costume Museum

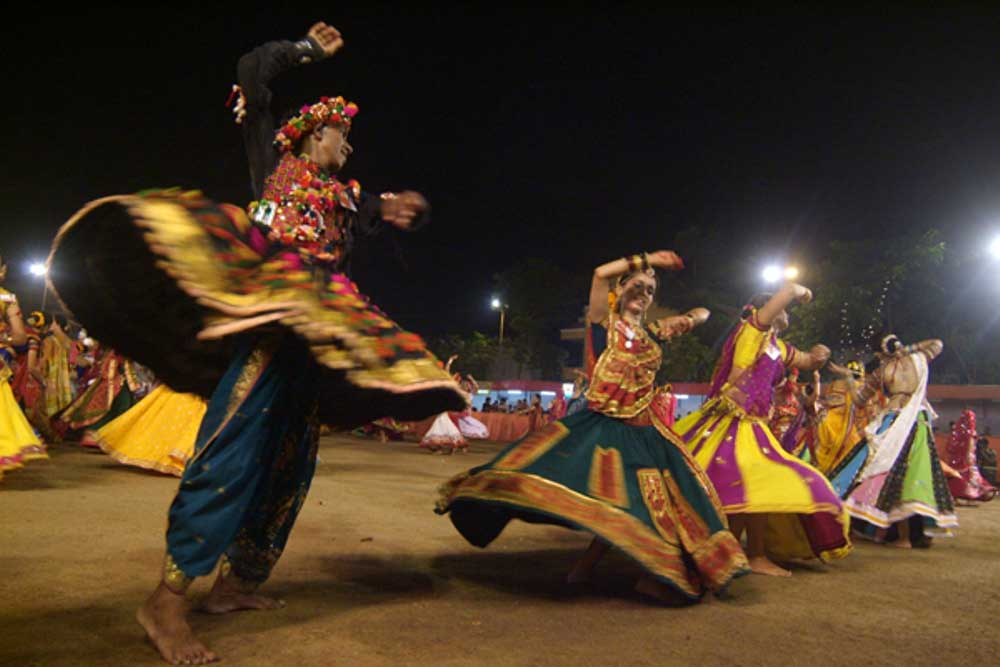
Man on the left in jama and chorno (jama/suruwal)

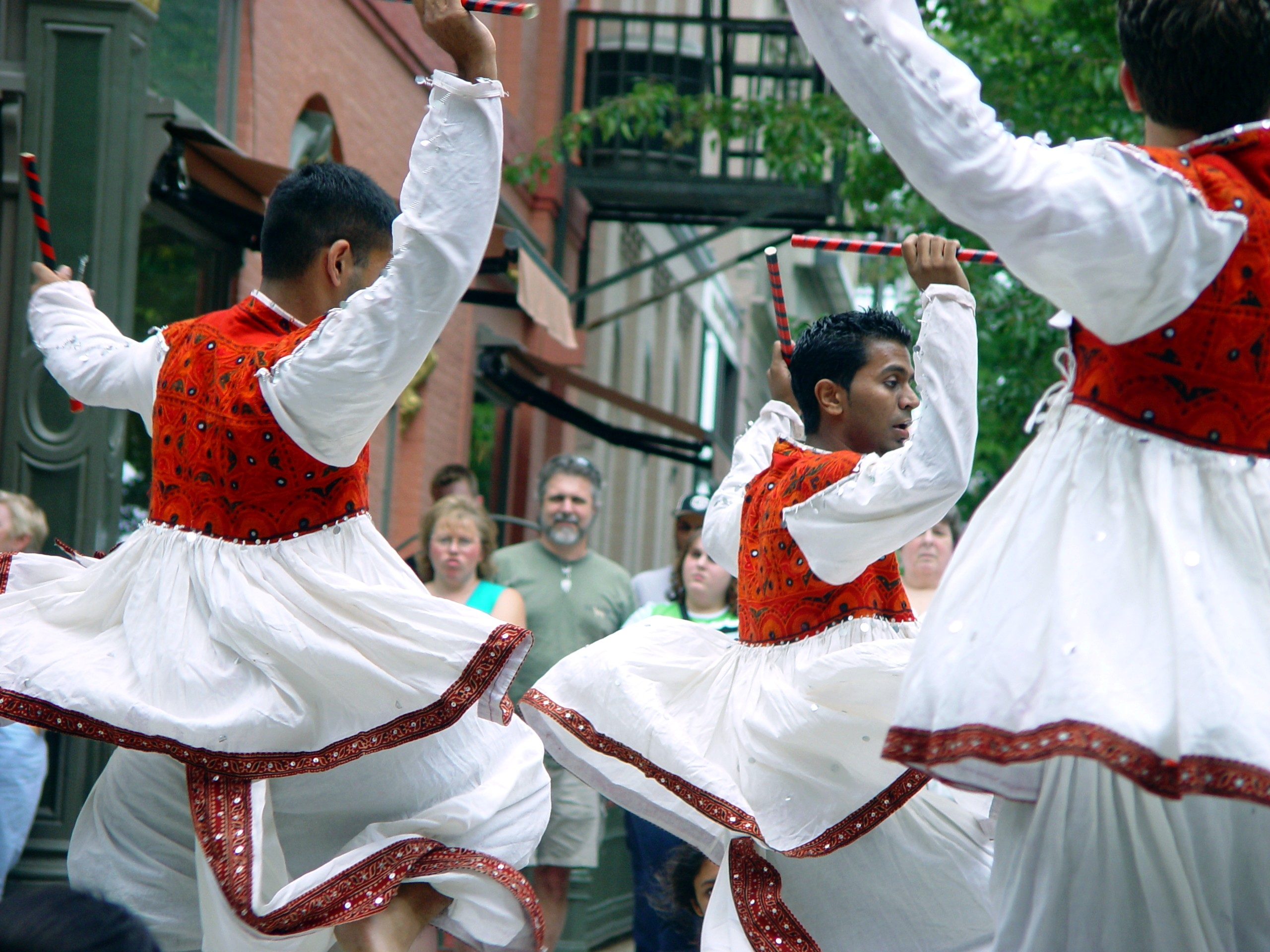
Gujarati men in kediyu

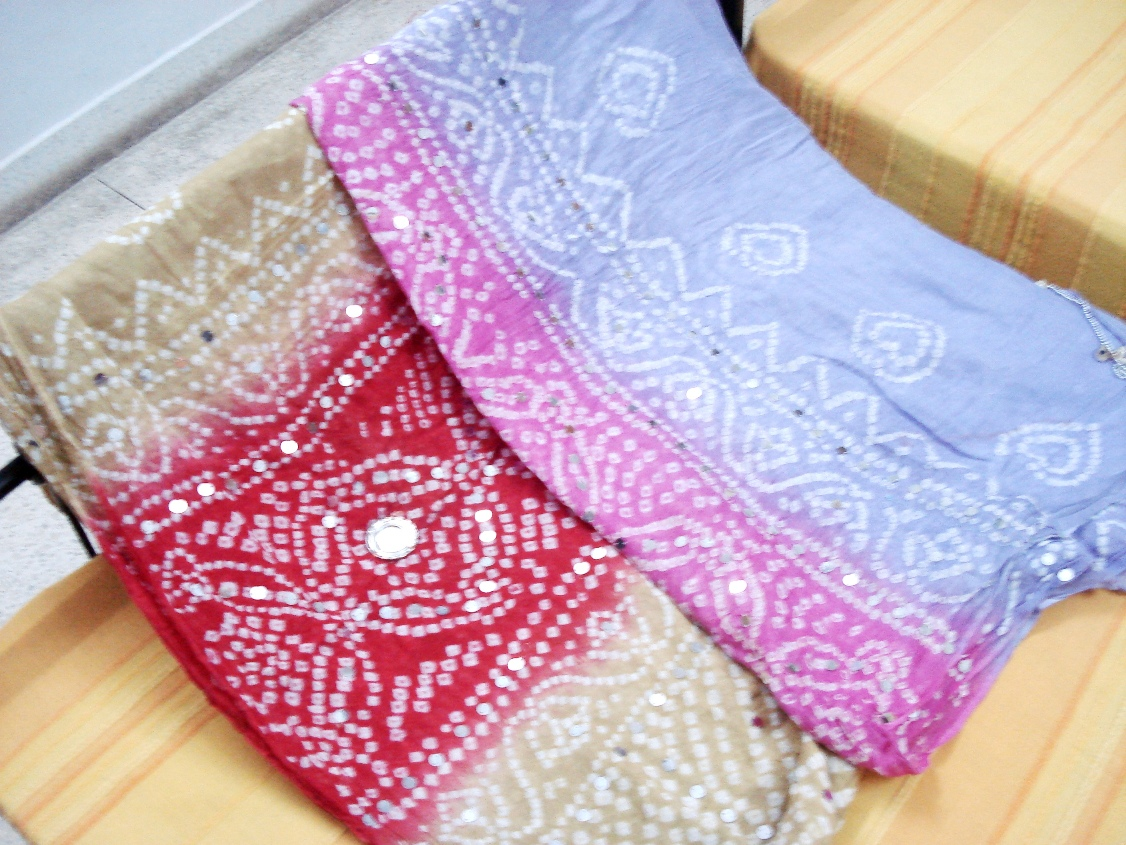
Bandhani prints

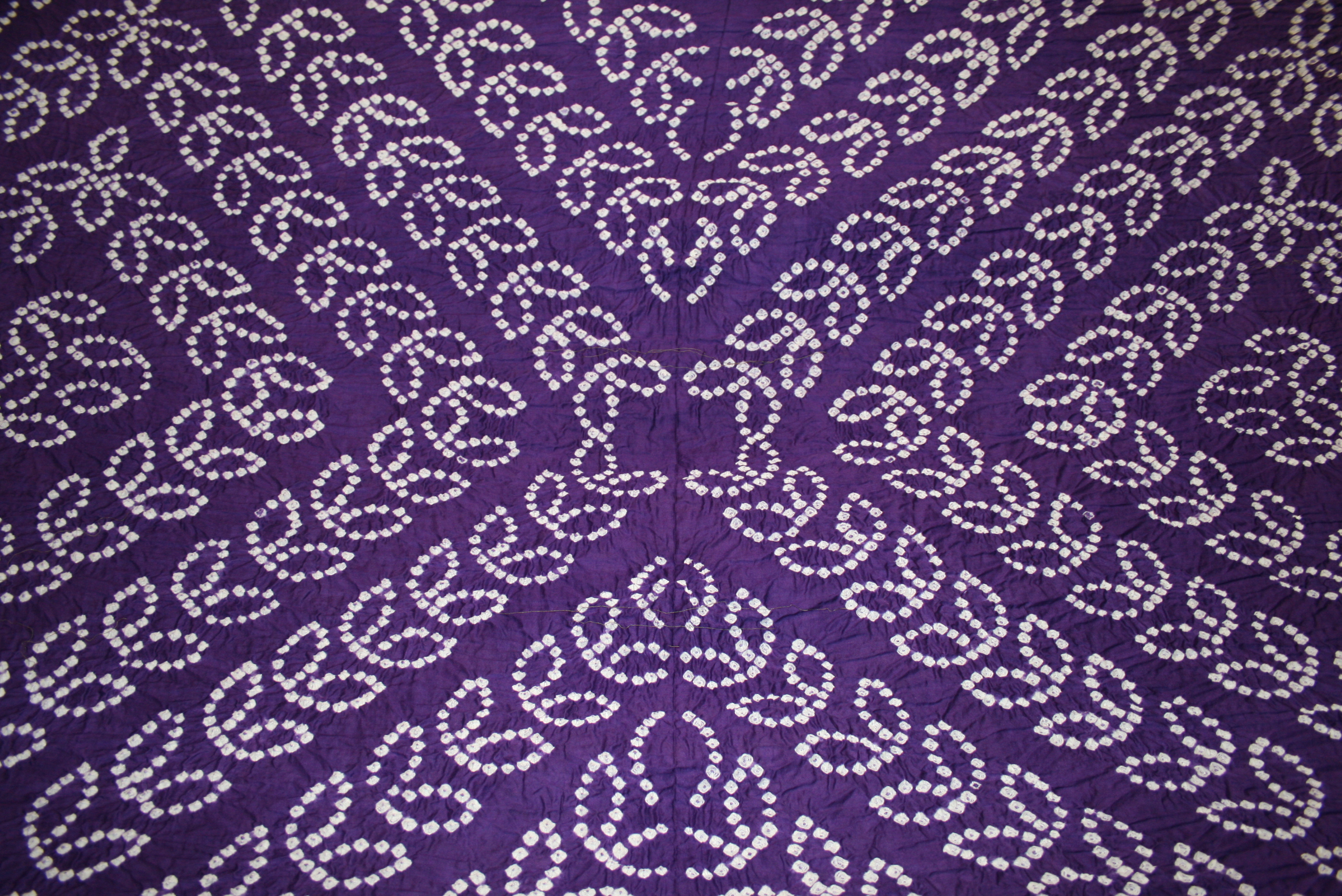
Bandhani print open

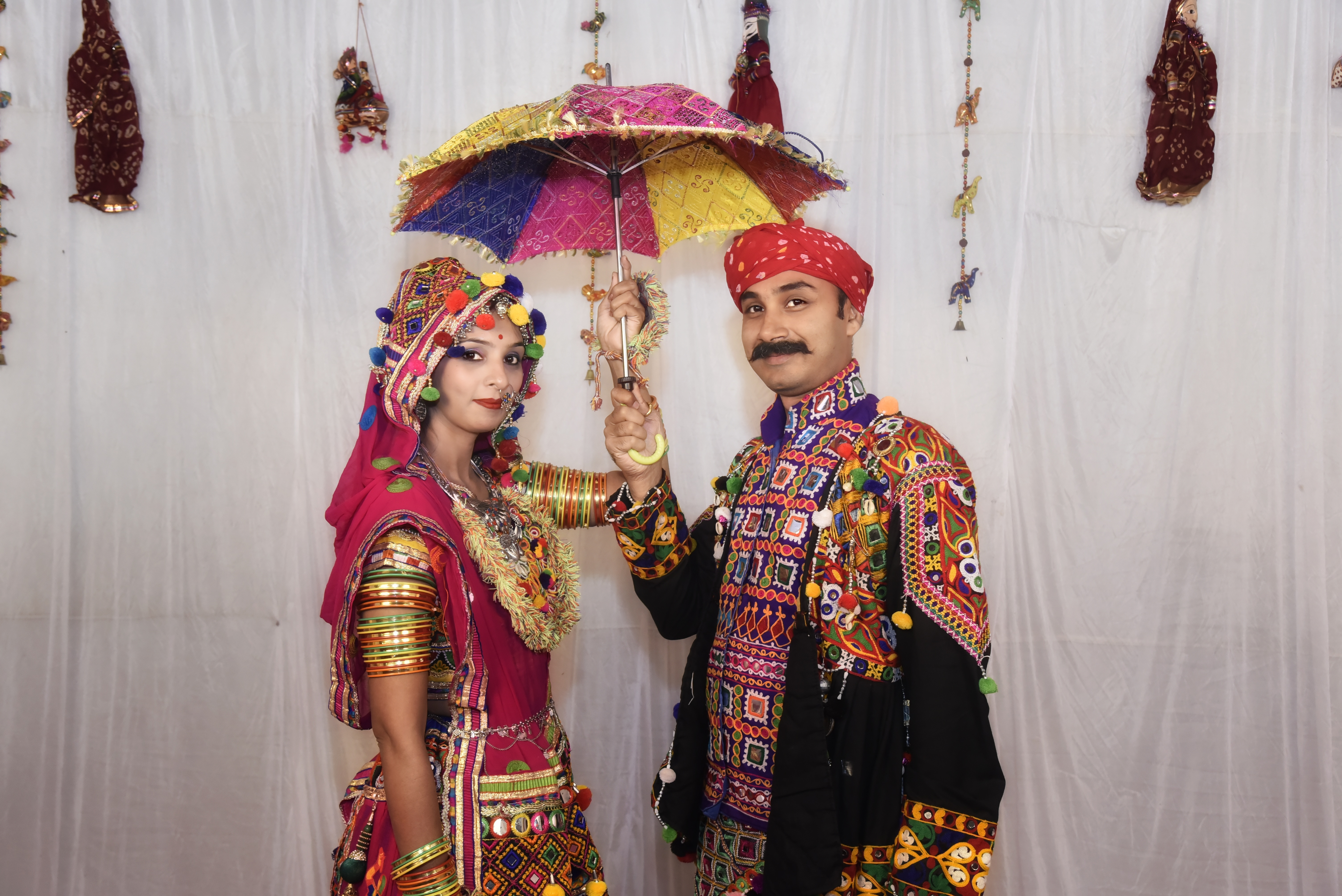
Traditional Folk dance Garba dress: Man in Kediyu

== See also ==
- Central Asian clothing
- Chemise
- Chikankari
- Churidar
- Dhoti
- Dupatta
- Gagra choli
- Khet partug
- Kurta
- Perahan tunban
- Kashmiri phiran and poots
- Qamis
- Sari
- Sherwani
- Sirwal
- Turkish salvar
