= British Gujaratis =

Diaspora community in the United Kingdom

- Distribution by regional authority (England and Wales only)

Total population
- 600,000-800,000

Regions with significant populations
- London(Wembley · Harrow · Queensbury) · Leicester · North West · Kirklees

Languages
- Gujarati · English · Hindi · Urdu

Religion
- Hinduism · Islam · Jainism · Christianity · Zoroastrianism

Related ethnic groups
- Gujaratis · British Indians · East African Indians

British Gujaratis are residents of the United Kingdom who trace their ancestry to the region of Gujarat. They form the largest ethno-linguistic subgroup of British Indians, numbering 800,000. This includes a diverse population consisting of British-born Gujaratis, migrants directly from the region of Gujarat, and East African Gujaratis who migrated to the United Kingdom fleeing discrimination. Around half of the United Kingdom's 2 million Indians have roots in Gujarat. Gujaratis have contributed significantly to British Indian and broader British culture. Gujaratis are known for having revitalised corner shops and being relatively prosperous among immigrant groups in the United Kingdom.

== History ==
Gujarati connections with the United Kingdom date back to the British Raj, when the East India Company founded a trading post in Surat. During British colonization, the Gujaratis and British participated in a significant exchange of information, including that of one another's histories. Today, many British Gujaratis are either themselves, or descended from, first generation immigrants from India. Alternatively, a notable amount are also descended from the Gujarati community of East Africa, who are themselves forcible migrants to the area. Despite being British Subjects, Gujaratis had restricted access to Britain after successive Immigration acts of 1962, 1968 and 1971. However, many were accepted into the country following dictator Idi Amin's expulsion of Uganda's 80,000 strong Indian community in 1972.

== Demographics ==
Today, nearly half of England's Gujarati speakers reside in Greater London, where they are predominantly found in the boroughs of Harrow, Brent, Barnet, and Newham. Specifically, the community of Wembley and Harrow has been considered a center for Gujarati culture and cuisine throughout London and the United Kingdom. Additionally, the city of Leicester in the East Midlands has a very large Gujarati community, with those speaking Gujarati accounting for about 12% of the city's population. The city's large Gujarati population has led to many calling it a "Gujarati city". However, several communities in Northern England also have large Gujarati populations including the primarily working-class towns of Bolton, Preston, and Blackburn with Darwen.

The majority of Gujaratis throughout the United Kingdom practice Hinduism, with significant minorities practicing Jainism, Islam, and Christianity. London's Gujarati community is overwhelmingly Hindu, though Jain minorities exist in Harrow. Leicester's Gujarati community is largely Hindu, though parts of the city have large and influential Gujarati Muslim communities, which form the bulk of the city's Islamic population. However, Northern England's Gujarati enclaves are largely Muslim, though with Hindu minorities.

Some people in the United Kingdom classified as "Gujarati" may be part of the Kutchi ethnic group, whose homeland is northernmost parts of Gujarat. Additionally, the Memons, who hail from the Kathiawar Peninsula may be considered Gujarati despite their language being considered a dialect of Sindhi. The United Kingdom also has a large and influential community of Parsis, who speak the Gujarati language despite practicing Zoroastrianism.

== See also ==
- Gujarati people
- British Indians
- Anglo-Indians
- Expulsion of Indians from Uganda
