= Central Asian clothing =

Traditional costumes of Central Asia

In Central Asian countries such as Uzbekistan, Turkmenistan and Tajikistan, and as well as Afghanistan the tunic and loose trousers ensemble forms part of traditional costume. Men will wear turbans or hats with their tunics and sirwals whilst women will wear scarves or hats.

== Lozim and kuylak ==
Men in Central Asian Uzbekistan traditionally wear the sirwal known as lozim in which is wide. Over the lozim, women wear dresses known as kuylak which are generally full sleeved and fall to below the knees but some can be long dresses. A head scarf is traditionally worn over the head which is tied at the back of the neck. Some women also use a second scarf.

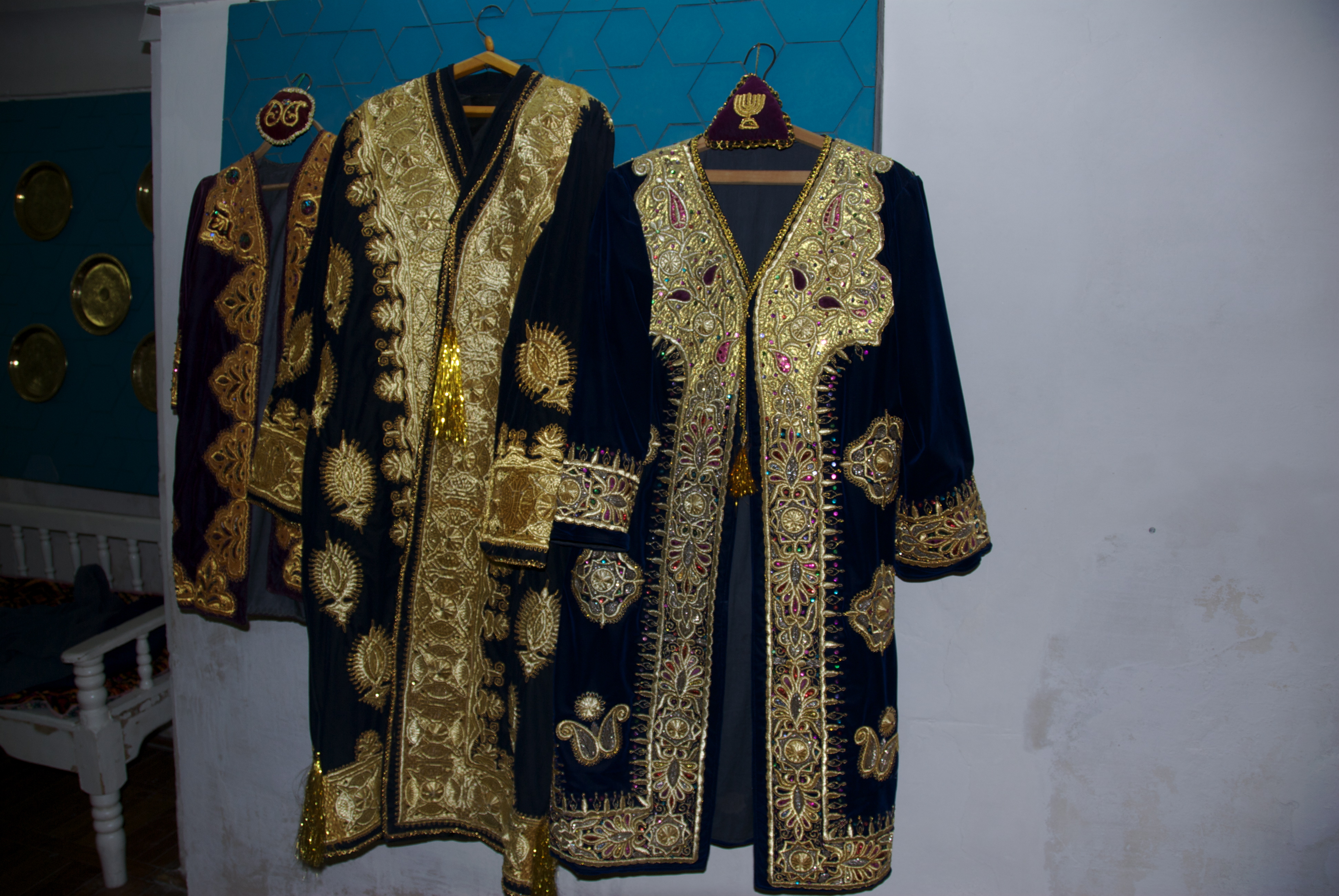
Uzbekistan coat−

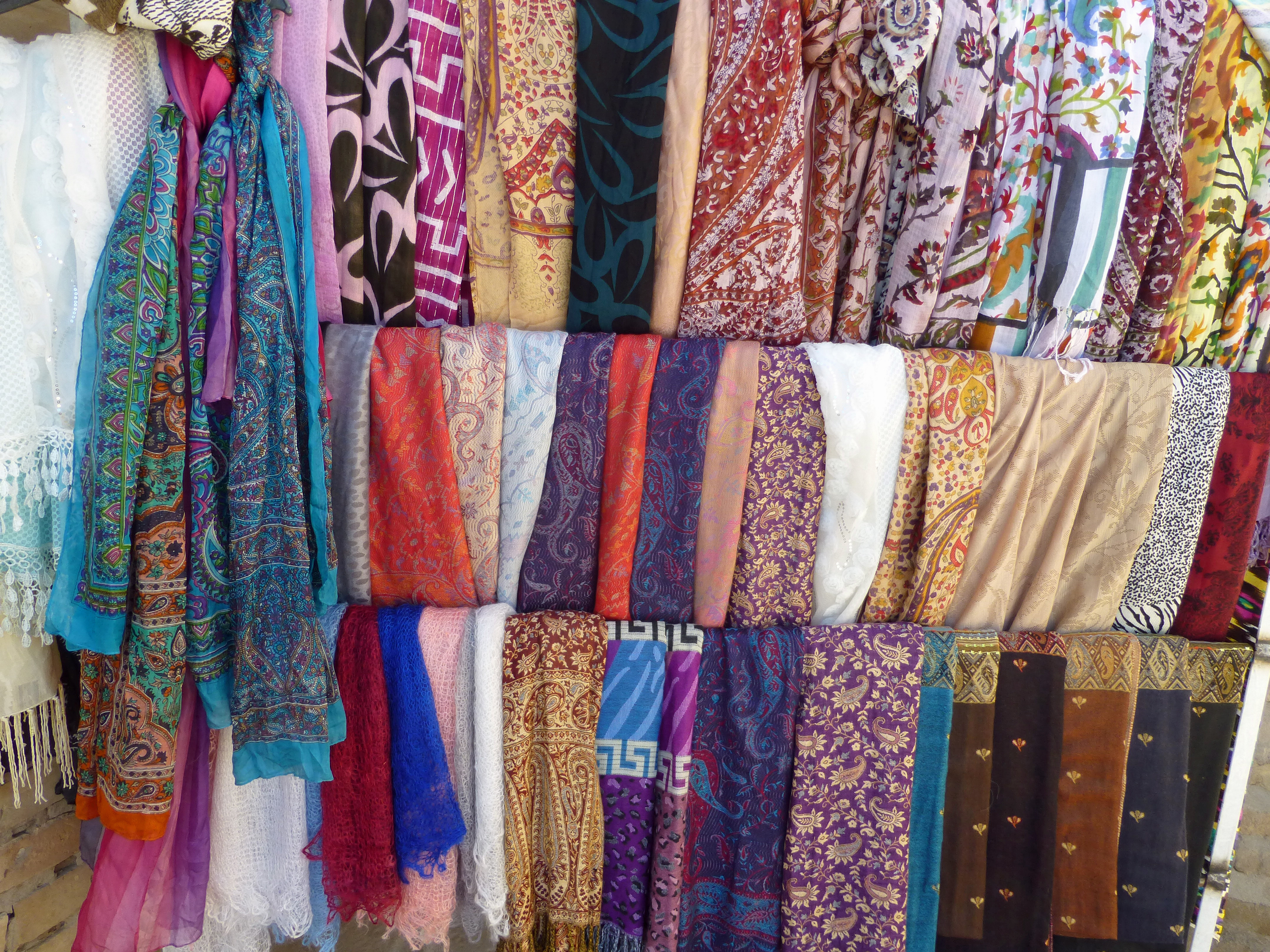
Khiva-Foulards. Uzbekistan material

== Lozim and chakmon ==
Men of Uzbekistan wear the lozim with a long robe called the chakmon.

== Izor and kurta ==
Women in Tajikistan also wear dresses which are long robes called kurta with sirwal called izor (also referred to as sharovary) tied at the ankles. The ankle gathers are tied with a cord. Head scarfs are also worn.

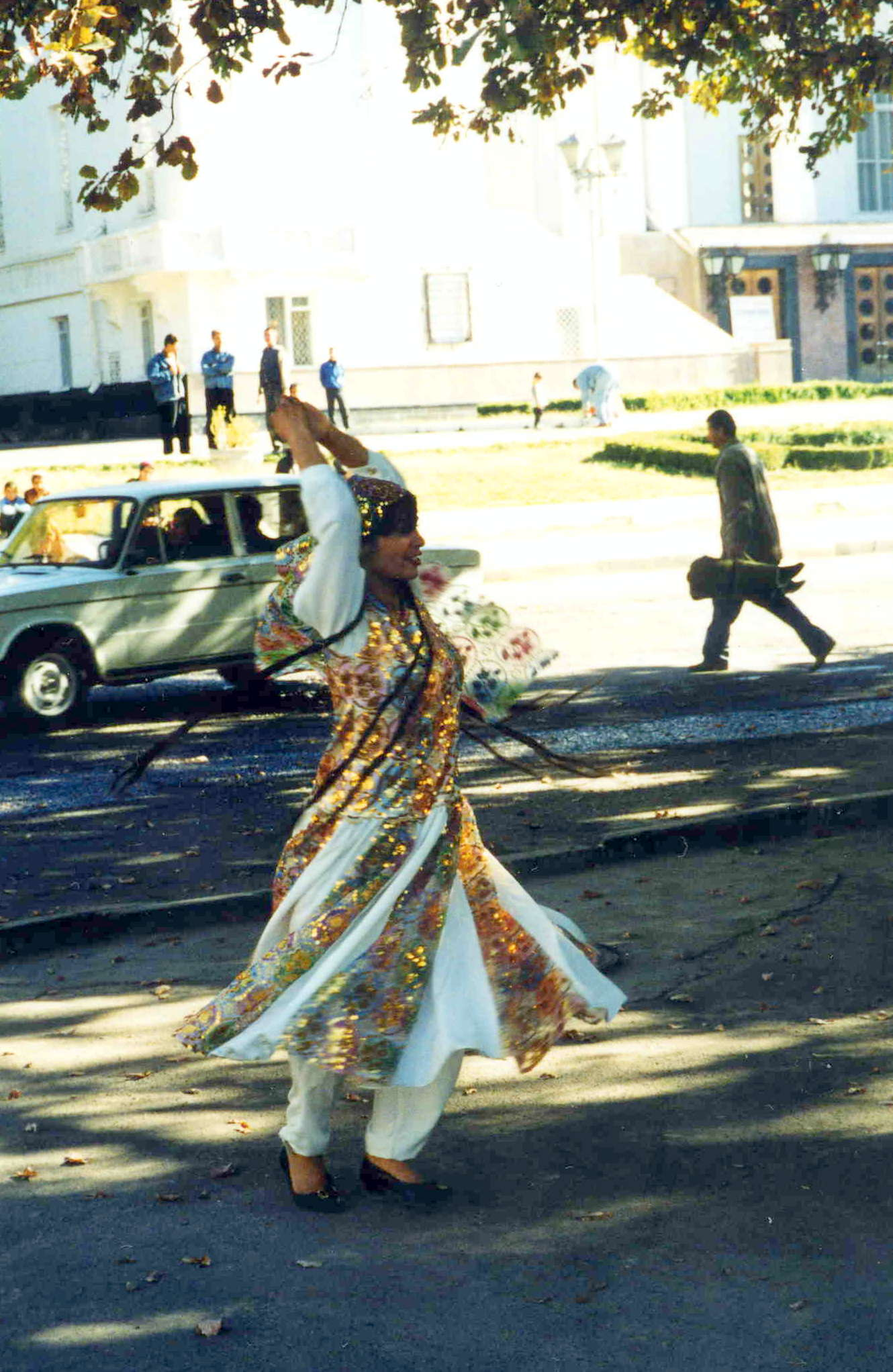
Dancer in Tajikistan

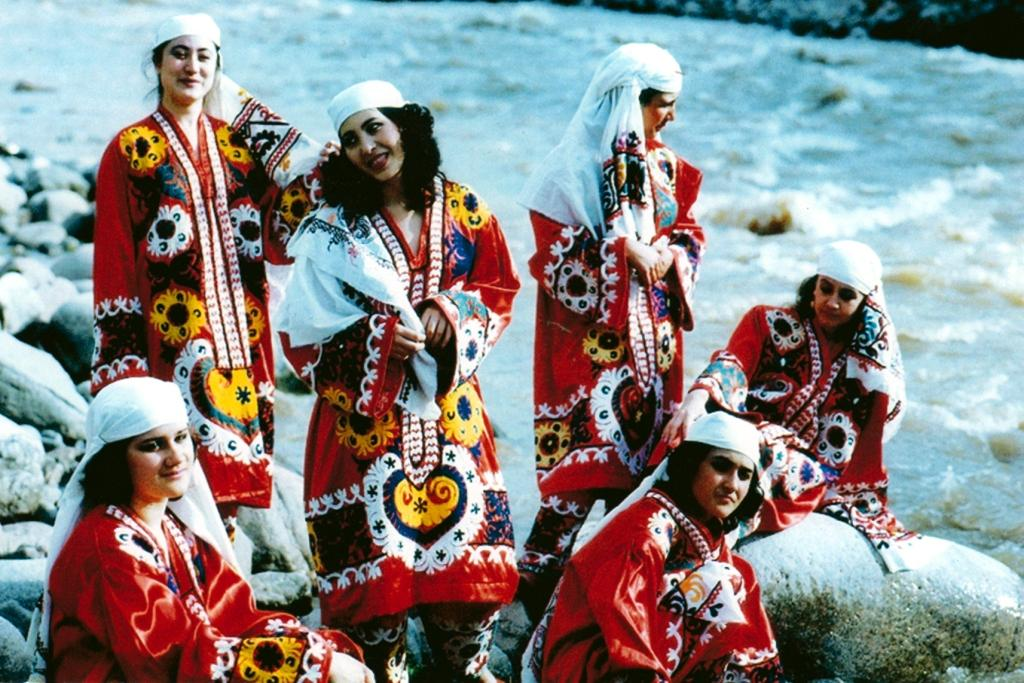
Tajik dress

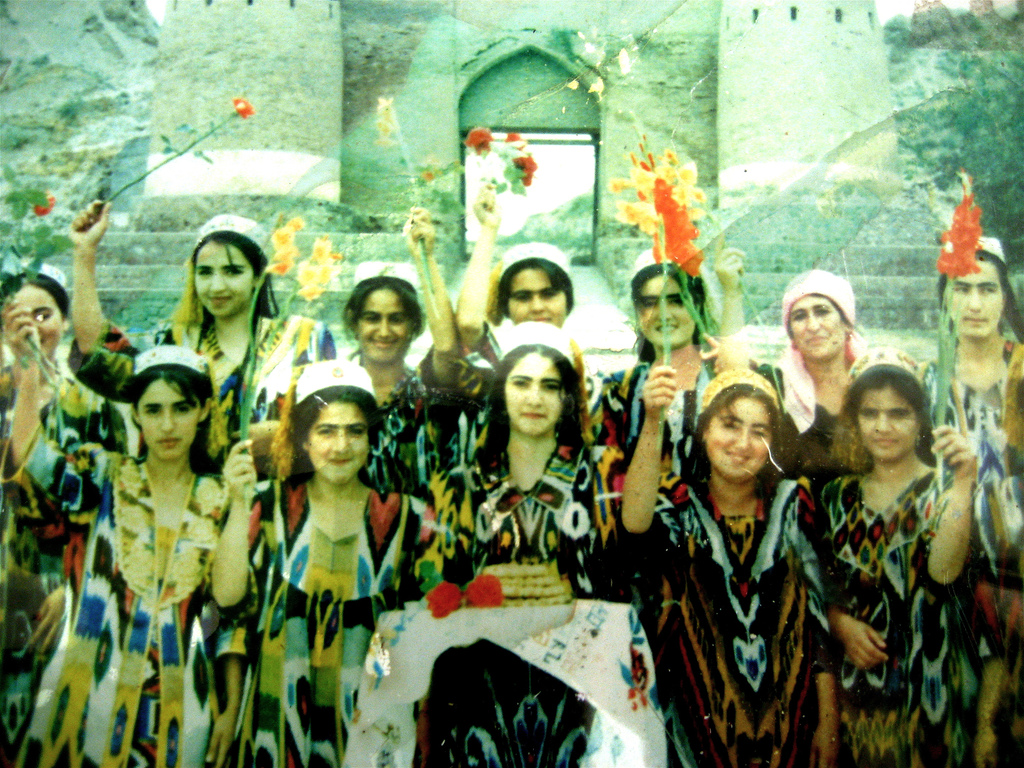
Tajik women

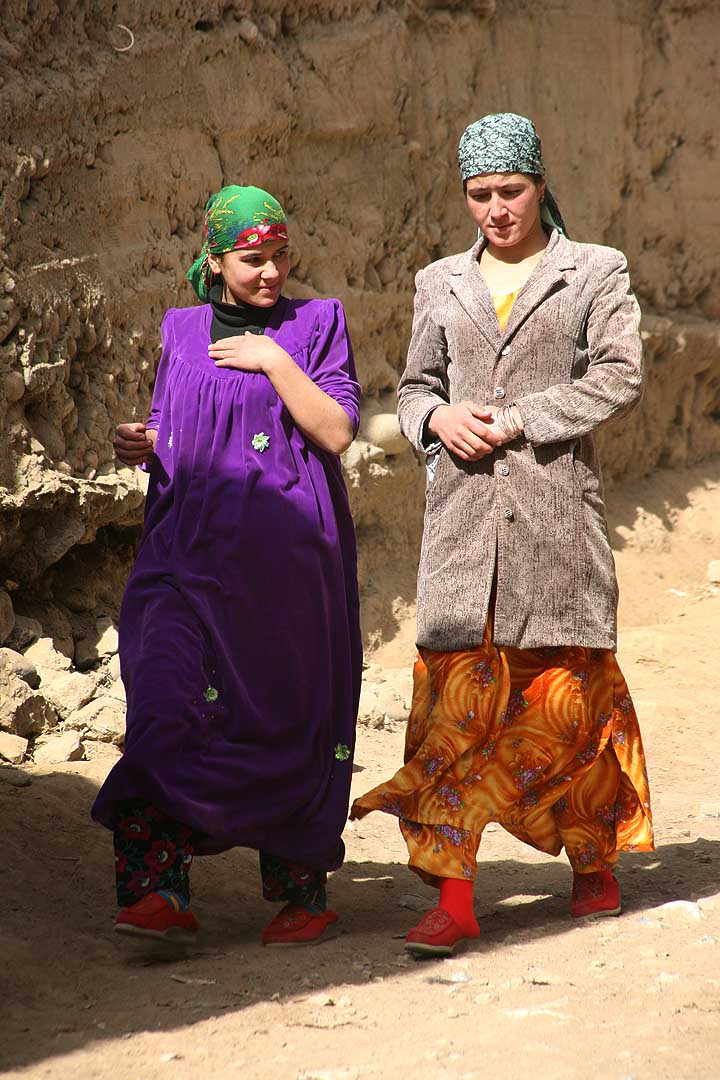
Tajik women

== Balaq and koynak ==
The dress of women of Turkmenistan consists of under trousers called balaq, a dress called koynak and a headdress.

== See also ==
- Clothing in Afghanistan
- Islamic clothing
- Saka § Clothing
- Scythian clothing
- Sogdia § Clothing
- Tocharian clothing
- Uyghurs § Clothing
