= European loose trousers =

The sirwal or shalwar forms part of traditional costume in some parts of Europe.

== Sharovary pants ==
The salvar is known as sharovary in Eastern Europe, which is worn with any upper garment. In Ukraine, the sharovary are voluminous.

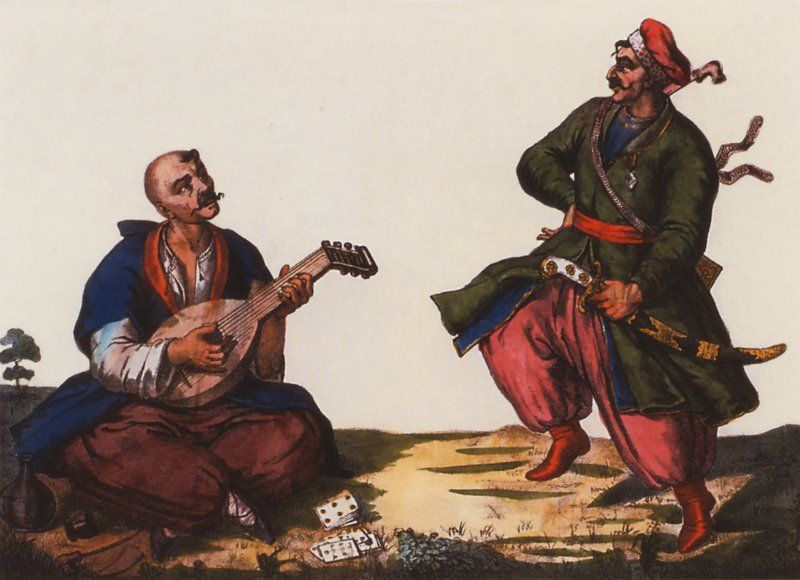
Ukrainian Cossacks wearing sharovary, 1760s

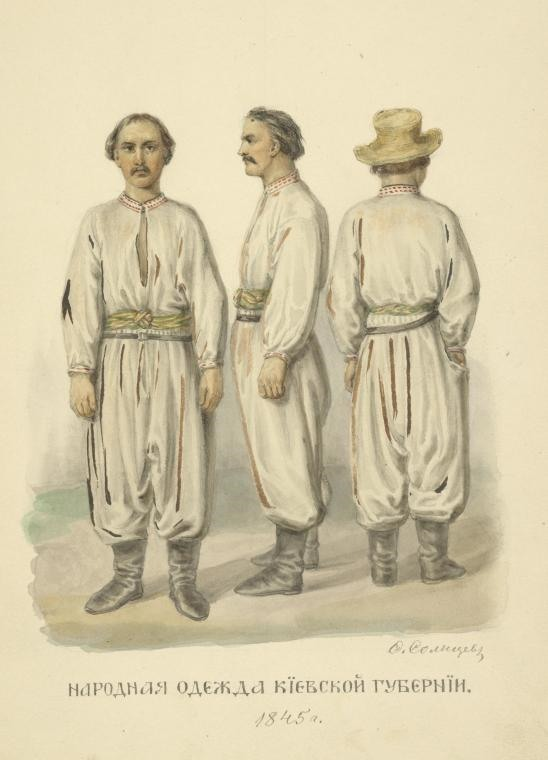
Ukraine, 19th century

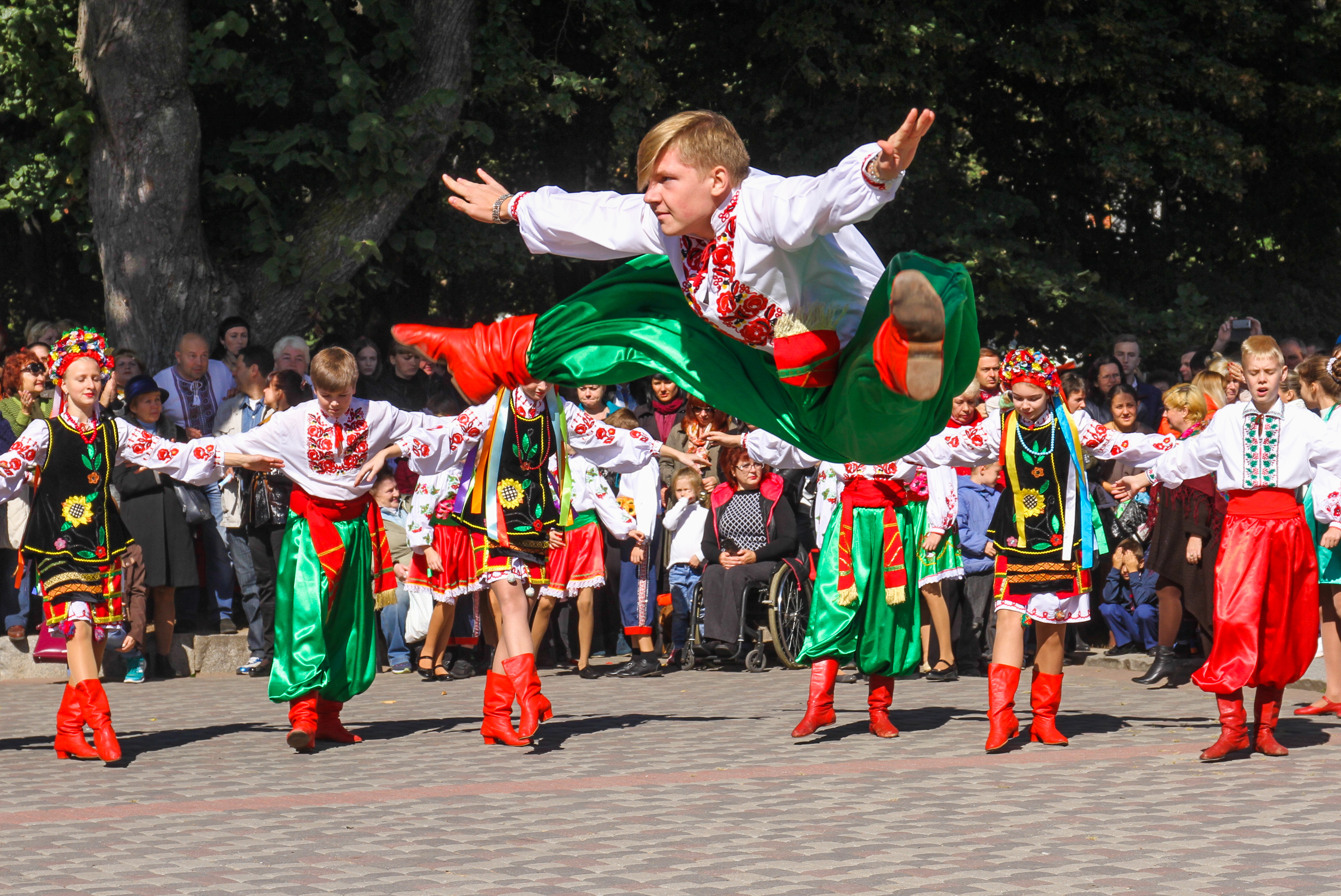
Ukrainian folk ensemble, 2016

== Dimije, kat-haljina ==
In Bosnia and Herzegovina, Montenegro, and Serbia, the salvar is known as the dimija which has a local style. The kat-haljina suit is a combination of a European style blouse and dimije made from the same material. See also Serbian traditional clothing.

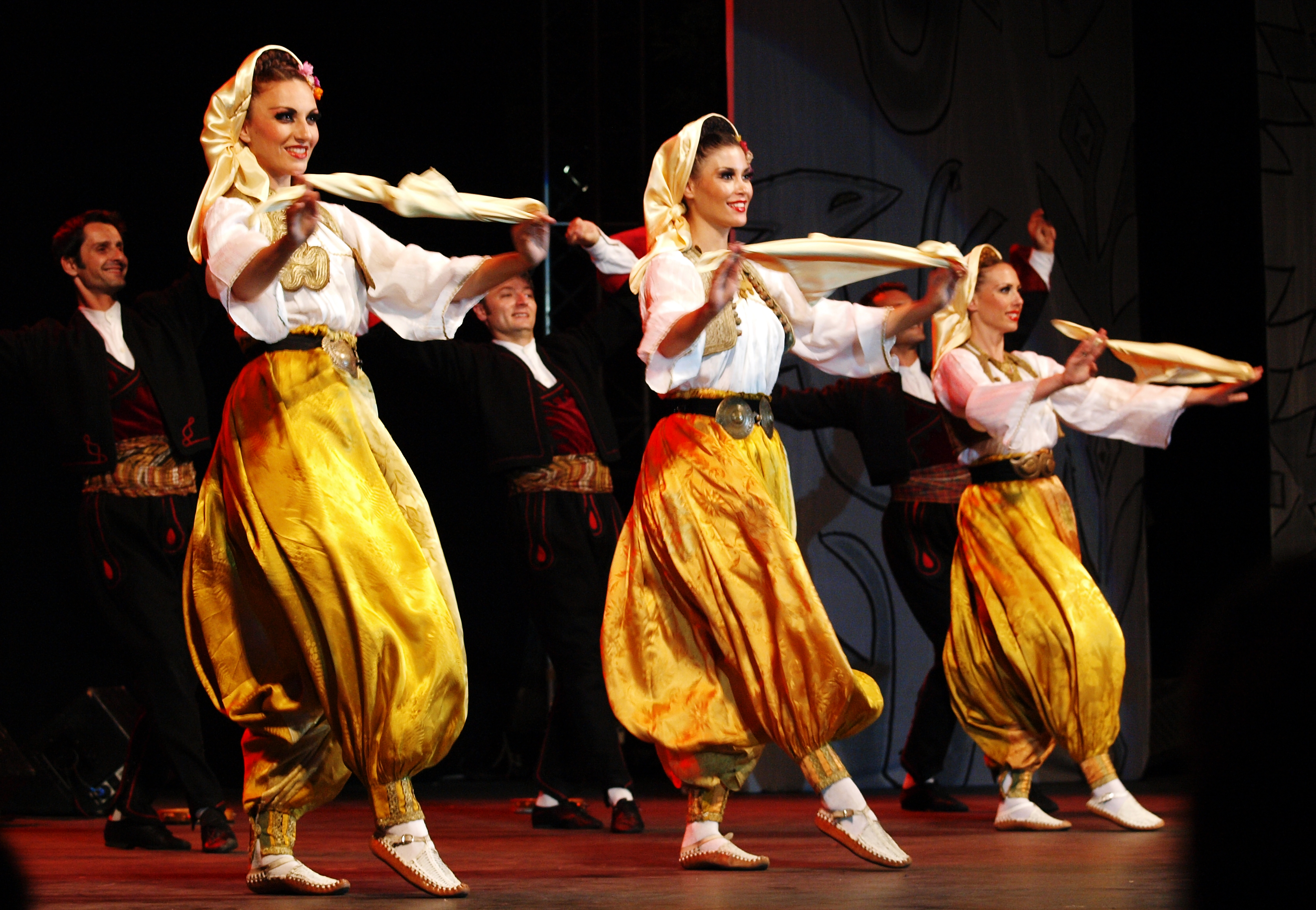
South Serbia, girls are wearing dimije

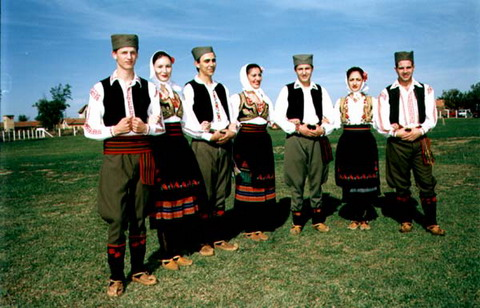
Serbia

== Bulgaria ==
The salvar and similar trousers are also worn in Bulgaria.

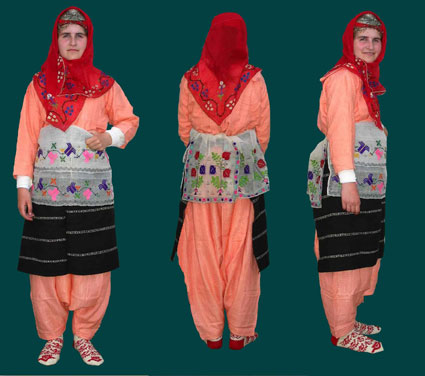
Turkish women of General Kiselovo village (Bulgaria)

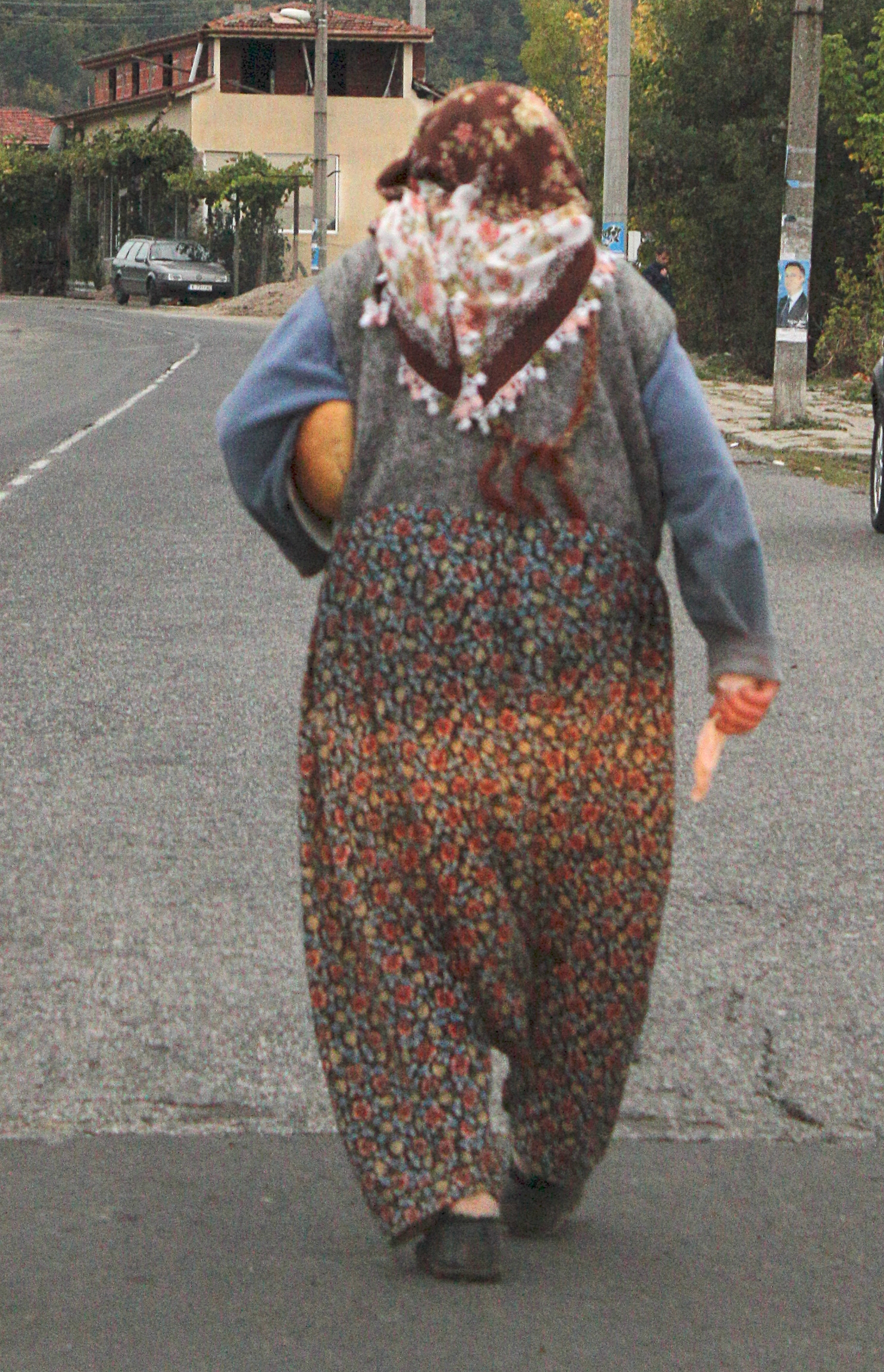
Schalwari in Kardzhali Province, Bulgaria

== Greece/Crete ==
Baggy pants of various types called vraka (βράκα) are traditional pants in parts of Greece (such as Crete, the Greek islands and Cyprus) and Macedonia.

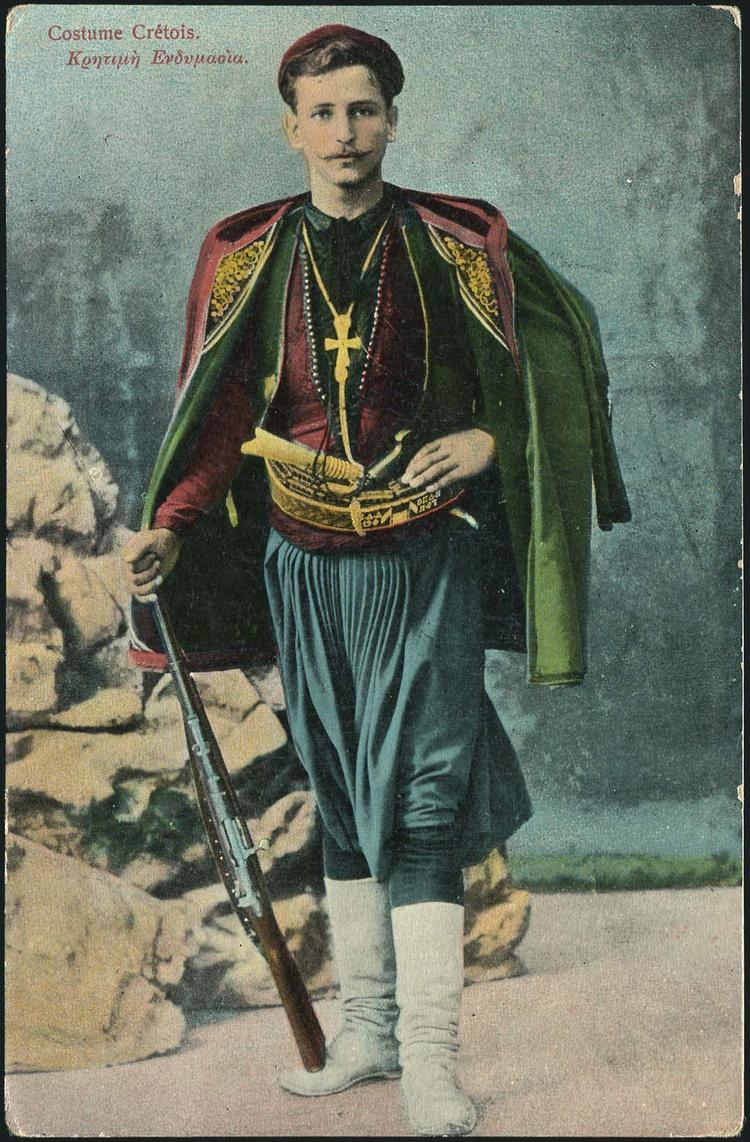
Cretois Costume

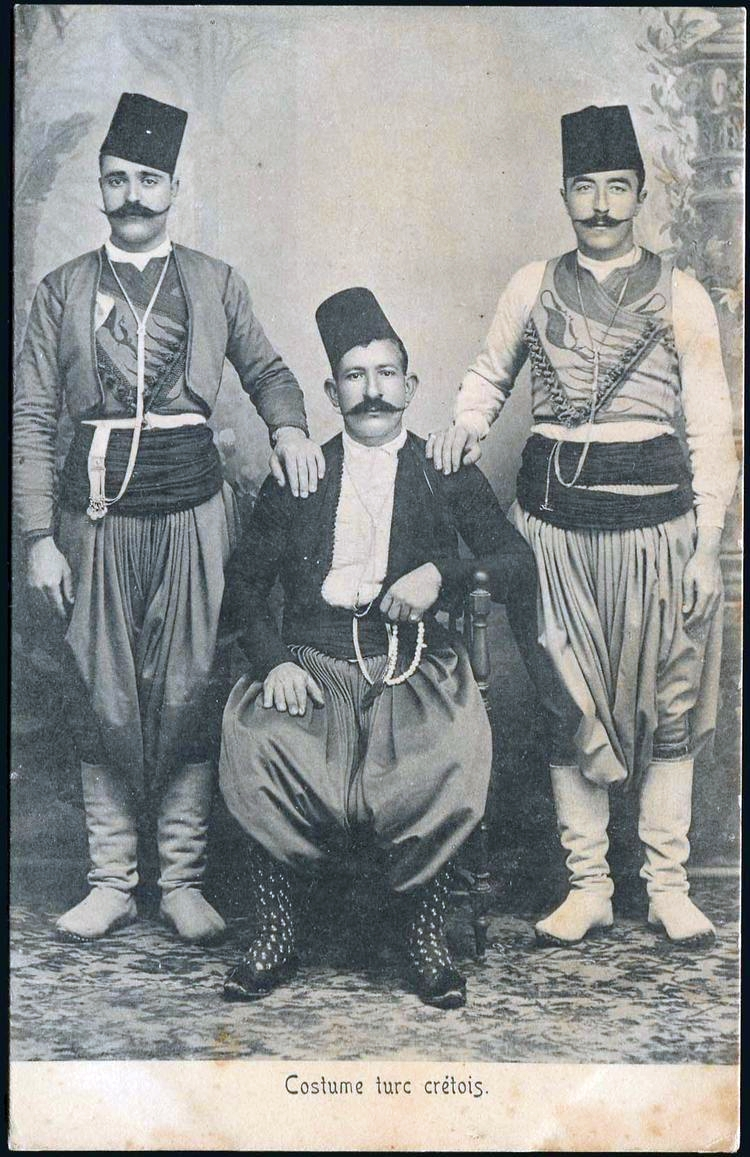
Cretan Turks

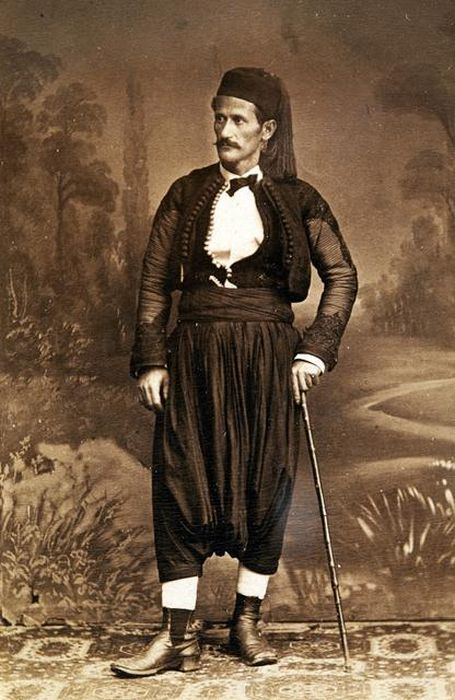
Szathmari - Balkan dress 19th century

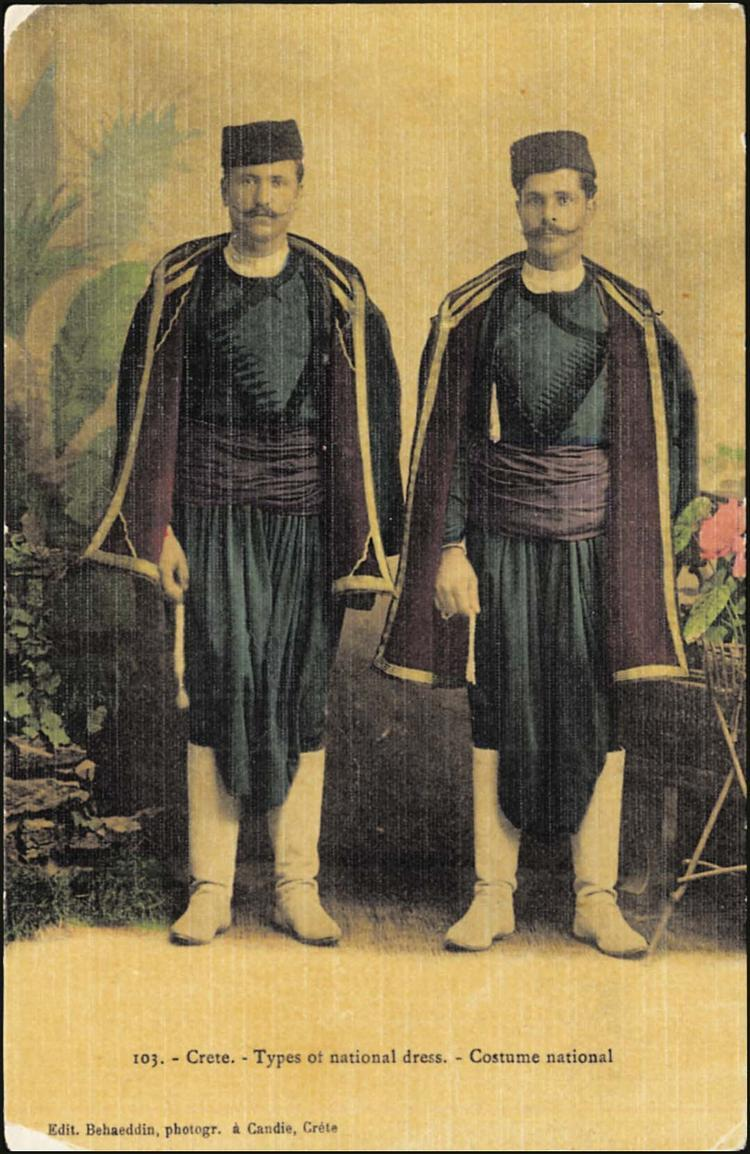
Crete national Costume

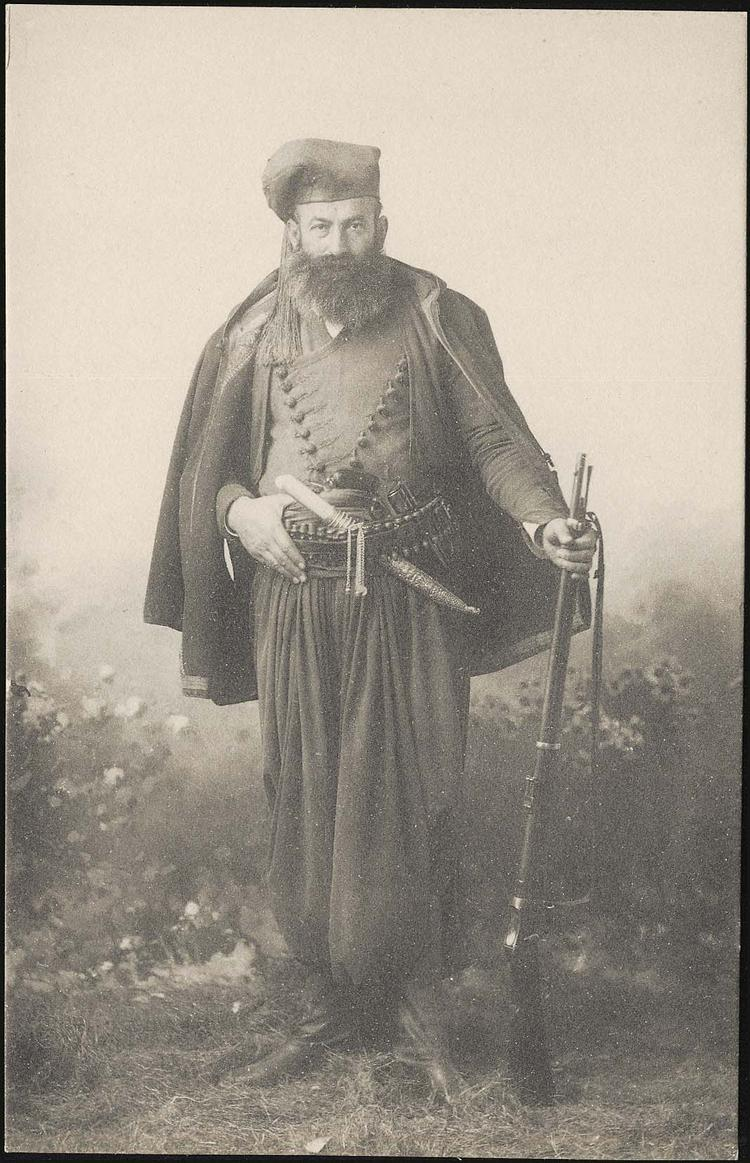
Vraka Greek costume

== See also ==
- Turkish salvar
