= Kankō Ainu =

Japanese term for some practitioners of Ainu culture for tourism purposes

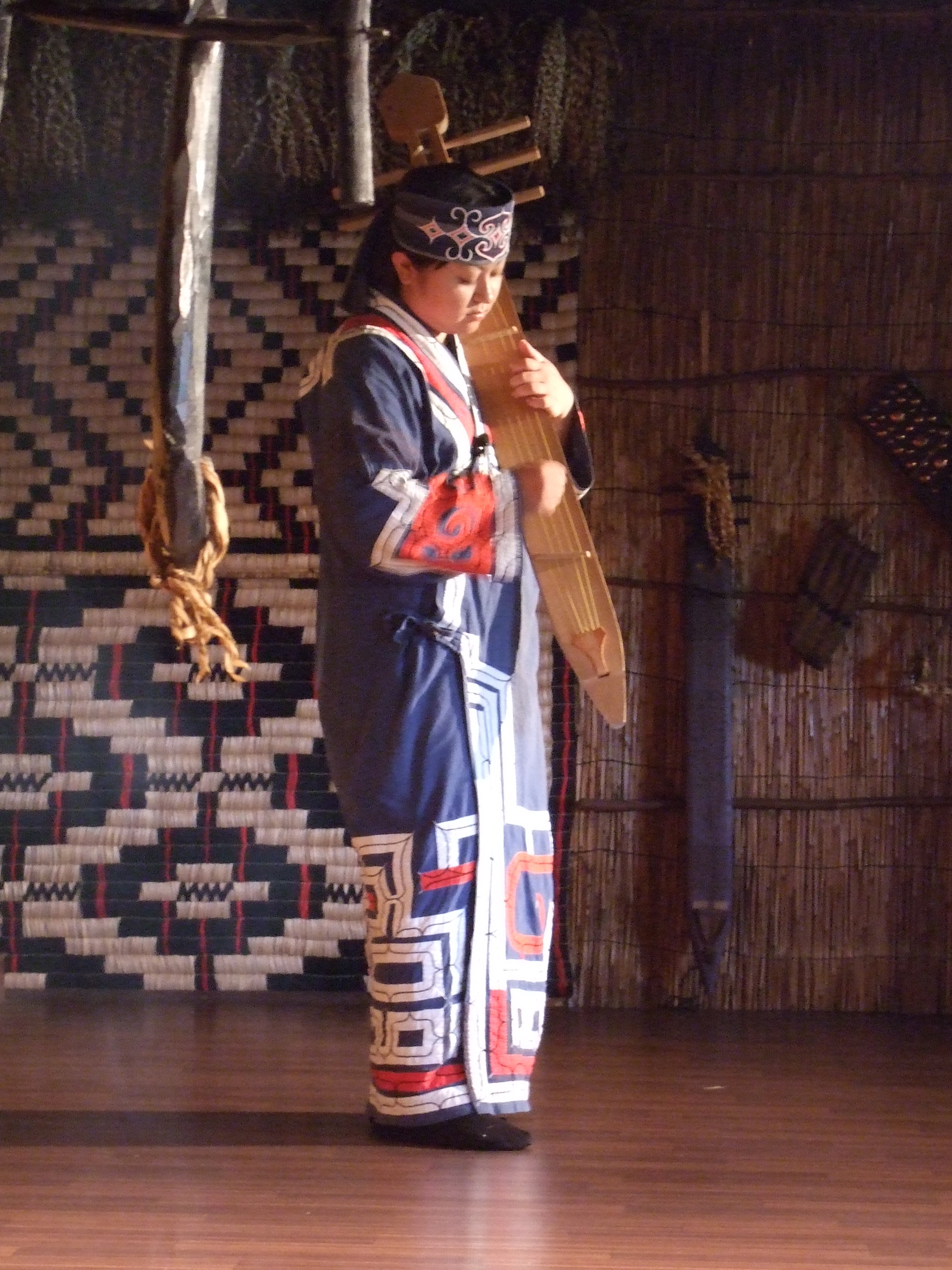
A woman performs on the traditional tonkori while dressed in traditional Ainu attire.

"Kankō Ainu" (Japanese: 観光アイヌ; "tourist Ainu") is the Japanese term for Ainu people who are considered to live or portray a traditional or pseudo-traditional depiction of the Ainu people and their lifestyle in order to cater to the tourism industry.

The practice of portraying indigenous Japanese traditions for tourism purposes has been criticised and protested by some Ainu advocates, including complaints that tourist Ainu sites do not represent genuine Ainu culture, but rather a stereotype of the Ainu from the wajin (majority Japanese) perspective. However, other Ainu people do not hold the view that the practice is a negative one, instead considering it a positive to be able to make a living producing and selling traditional Ainu handicrafts and performing traditional Ainu artforms for an audience.

== Background ==
=== Before the Edo Period ===
Ainu people live in nature and use natural materials. They had their own culture which was different in Japanese culture at the moment. Particularly, the Ainu ethnic focused on the connection of Gods called Kamuy (カムイ) which control nature and animals and they did a ritual performed with singing and dancing to show their appreciation of Gods and connect to them. By the way, researchers found documents written in later Heian to early Kamakura by Japanese which mentioned Ainu people. These tell ancient Japanese people and Ainu people had known each other and had connections.

In fact, members of Tohoku bushi in Kamakura era were defeated by Minamoto no Yoritomo, the shogun of Kamakura Bakufu at that time. They ran away and reached the Hokkaido area. Some of them went up north deeply to gain rich marine products and seafood. As a result, Japanese people made the community of Japanese along the coast of southern Hokkaido in the Muromachi era. In the 15th century, the Japanese communities had given pressure of living fields to the original Ainu communities. In addition, the conflicts between them came up by 1536. In 1551, Suehiro Kakizaki who was the leader of the community of Matsumae made peace with Ainu and empowered his political management in the area. This situation made unstainable periods in Ainu, but the situation also unified Ainu communities. After that, Kakizaki changed the name to Matsumae, Hideyoshi who was the Minister of government at that time allowed Matsumae to have the right to monopolize the commerce between Ainu and Japanese in 1950.

=== Edo Period ===
In the 17th century, the relations between Matsumae clan and Ainu deteriorated because the Matusmae clan controlled Chishima areas Hokkaido and Sakhalin. Then, Samkusaynu, leader of Ainu, unified Ainu people again and resisted Matsumae's expansion movements called Samkusaynu’ war (1669). Appropriately, the Matsumae clan defeated Samkusaynu and Ainu resistances. Matsumae strengthened its political and economical power against Ainu. The clan aimed to use young Ainu people as workers at fishery harbours to earn money and tax. The forced works caused the decrease of workers in Ainu communities and made Ainu society poor. In those days, the clan needed to protect Ainu's culture because the clan wanted “Ainu” to work. In other words, the identity as Ainu is key to being Ainu people who were used as workers by the clan. Unlike the Meiji era, the government prohibited their culture, for example dancing, songs, and tattoo, the Matsumae clan did not allow Ainu to use Japanese language and Japanese customs.

However, because of Russia coming to the south, Edo Bakufu decided to control Hokkaido directly, it had changed the theory that it protects Ainu culture into the idea of assimilation of Ainu. The idea was going to be the basis of the rule about assimilation of Ainu people by the Meiji government. Between the 17th and early 18th century, Russia went south. Russia and the Russian emperor were interested in Japan through drifters from Japan, furthermore Russia wanted to trade with Japan. Russia sent people to Japan to return the drifters in Japan and to get conditions for trades. However, Bakufu denied it and stated the Russian government should give the drifters via the Netherlands because Japan had an isolation policy. Russia did not like the statement, then the tension was increasing between Japan and Russia in Okhotsk.

=== The Meiji Government Colonization ===
After Edo Bakufu collapsed, the tension between Japan and Russia remained. Hokkaido became a more important area for the Japanese government because the Boshin war, fight between the old Bakufu system and new government community, was opened in Hokkaido and the Ezo republic, which was the government by the old Bakufu members was established. New Japanese government, the Meiji government, had started the colonization of Ainu to protect Hokkaido from Russia and gain resources. The Meiji government sent people who lost their Bushi at the old Bakufu to open up Hokkaido lands. The government also wanted Ainu to develop the country, so it tried to turn Ainu into farmers and people in Japan. The assimilation required Ainu people to adopt Japanese names and adjust to Japanese culture, and prohibited Ainu culture such as Iomante, the one of significant ritual for Kamuy, and tattoo.

The biggest significant change was prohibiting hunting and catching fish and changing the habits of making food into cultivation. Because of the increasing population in Hokkaido in late Edo and heavy snow in early Meiji, deer, bear, and salmon were killed very much. Owing to a decrease in the number of them, hunting and fishing areas and time were controlled. Plus, the Ainu ethnic used to hunt to live, so they did not have know-how agriculture, which caused difficulty to live. Being forced into an uncomfortable lifestyle, Ainu people had physical problems, for instance lost physical strength and got sick easily. In addition, the proportion of Ainu people decreased. In Meiji 6th (1873), the population of Hokkaido was 111,196, in Meiji 26th (1893), it was 559,959. However, the proportion of Ainu people in Meiji 6 was about 15 per cent and it had become approximately 3 per cent in Meiji 26. That is why Ainu could not assimilate in Japanese society.

=== The Protection Law ===
The Meiji government kept colonization, which was an assimilation policy. In addition, imperialism was required for modernization. The Japanese government also focused on imperialism and power to gain the equal position as other empires, for instance Britain, France and so on. While the Meiji government processing its colonization, it published Hokkaido Former Aboriginal Protection Law or Hokkaido kyu-dojin hogo ho (北海道旧土人保護、1899-1997). The law officially attempts to save Ainu people from their poverty caused by the government expansion and assimilation policy. This law said that Ainu people should give equipment for cultivation, help Ainu who do not have official work and are suffering from illness, and to establish elementary school things like that. However, that statue was not helpful for the Ainu because it forced them to make crops and cultivation as before. The law also mentioned assimilation of Ainu people to native Japanese. It said that the government did not allow Ainu Ethnic education and culture instead educating in Japanese and forced speaking of Japanese. Ironically, the protection law included the difference between the lifestyles made Ainu ethnic poorer and more ethnocide.

These days, the protection law has been criticized because researchers believe the policy went under assimilation pressure and made Ainu farmers. This lead Ainu to more poverty and discrimination as minority then, they needed to stop sharing Ainu culture. The Law must have dealt a blow to Ainu people so these backgrounds are making a mainstream which is Ainu people are perfectly victims because they lost their identity by the assimilation policy. Furthermore, there is not much research on the relationship between their ethnicity and identity. However, experts are studying and reviewing Ainu's proactive actions to Japanese people at that time and relationships with them, again.

=== World Expo ===
In 1903, the 5th world expo, which was the symbol of imperialism, was held in Japan. This expo displayed minorities, for example, Ainu, Ryukyu and Chinese. Ryukyuan complained about this because they did not like that they were not part of Japan. Ainu people did not have a problem because Ainu people did not have any critics and a view that displaying is insulting them at that time. Moreover, in the 1890s, they had already used their culture to show people before tourism became the main issue. Due to these assimilated experiences, Ainu started to be aware of their culture as shown.

== Kanko Ainu ==
=== Ainu Tourism Industry ===
The Meiji government had expected Ainu citizens to change their identity into Japanese to get ethnic recognition. As a result, Ainu people had difficulty in passing their unique custom to the next generation. Ainu culture such as songs and dancing had been devastated in the mid-1930s. While suffering more from poverty, some Ainu people tried to survive with tourism against this complication. In the 1930s, they adjusted their ritual dancing and singing in order to appeal to tourists and earn money.

Japanese people viewed Ainu people as an ethnic minority and were interested in cultural observations of indigenous Ainu culture. In the 1950s, the term “Kanko Ainu” (観光アイヌ) was created in response to the expanding tourism and showcasing of Ainu culture for profit and wide-spread appeal. Ainu people working predominantly in Agricultural sectors had criticised what they deemed "Kanko Ainu", believing that the Kanko Ainu had commodified traditional Ainu culture for profit. Kanko Ainu tourism attempted to stimulate Ainu people's identity while preserving tradition, however, it remained a controversial topic at that time due to the criticism.

Tourism and cultural showcasing in Hokkaido were at their peak in the late 1950s to early 1970s. The number of tourists were estimated at roughly 608,219 in 1966 and 2,379,688 in 1974. Increased tourism and criticism of these widespread developments may have been the foundation that prompted the newly established law known as “The act on promotion of Ainu culture”. This law formally acknowledged Ainu people as indigenous to Japanese law, whilst recognising the need to support cultural industries and economic developments that support Ainu communities.

== See also ==
- Living history museum
- Sharovarshchyna
