= Harem pants =

Baggy pants, fit to the ankle

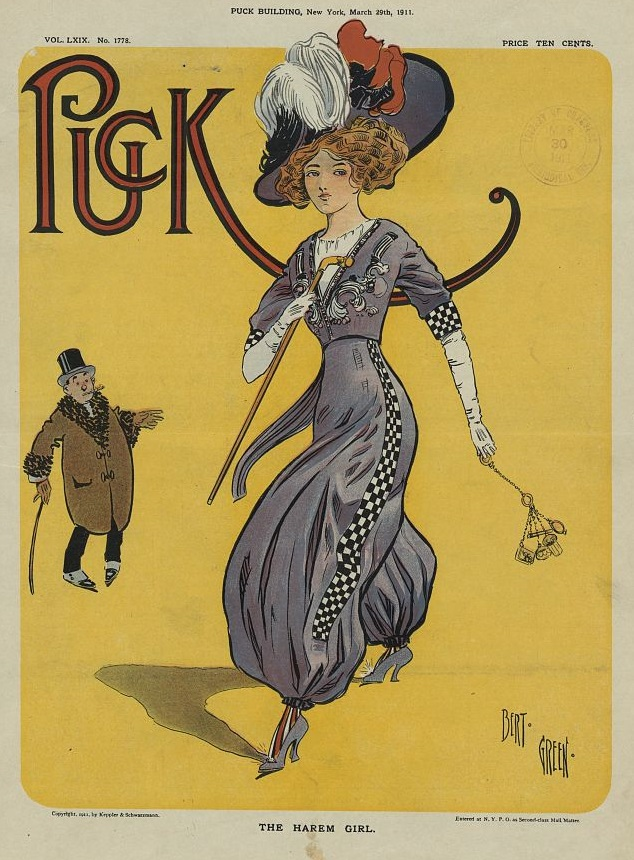
The Harem Girl, drawn by Bert Green for Puck, March 1911. A Western woman wearing the then newly fashionable 'harem' look, although the style would not catch on for long term in the West.

Harem pants or harem trousers are baggy, long pants caught in at the ankle. Early on, the style was also called a harem skirt. Inspired by Middle East clothing styles, especially şalvar (Turkish trousers), so-called 'harem pants/skirts' were introduced to Western fashion by designers such as Paul Poiret around 1910. The term 'harem pants' subsequently became popular in the West as a generic term for baggy trousers caught in at the ankle that suggest the Turkish style, or similar styles such as bloomers, the South Asian shalwar and patiala salwar; the Bosnian dimije; sirwal (as worn by Zouaves); and the Ukrainian sharovary.

== Early 20th century ==
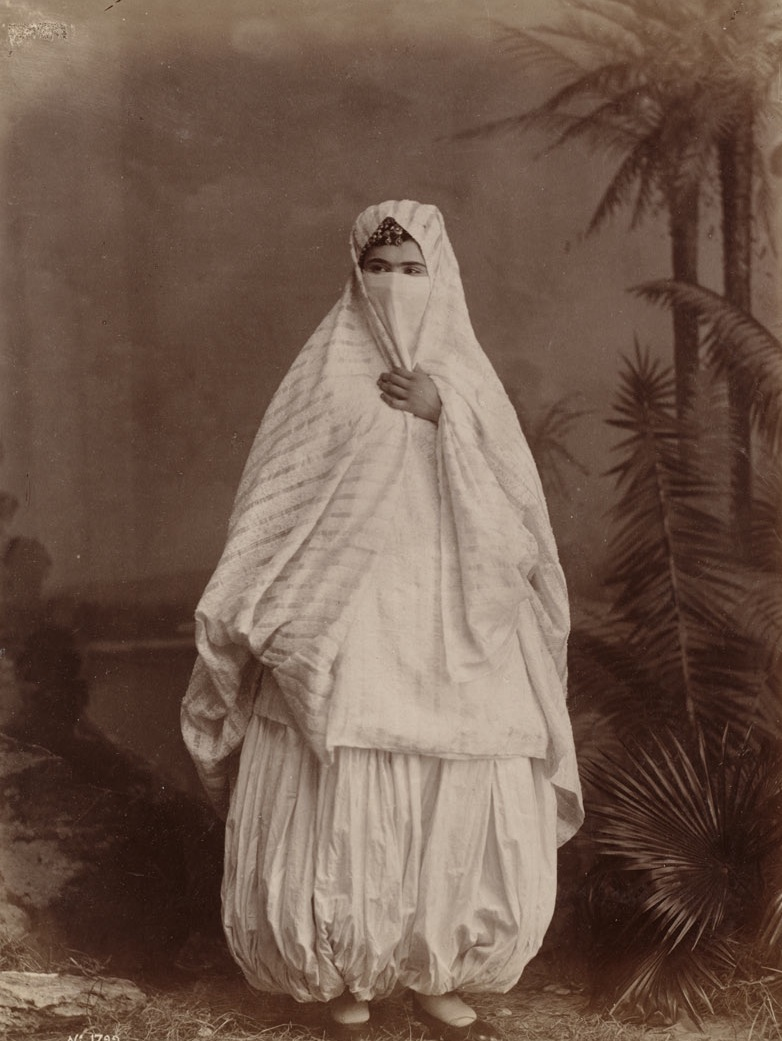
19th century Algerian woman wearing the traditional pants which inspired 'harem pants'.

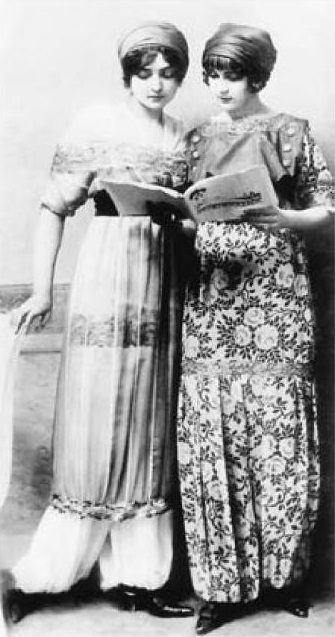
Paul Poiret harem pants, 1911

In 1911, the Paris couturier Paul Poiret introduced harem pants as part of his efforts to reinvent and 'liberate' Western female fashion. His "Style Sultane" included the jupe-culotte or harem pant, made with full legs tied in at the ankle. Alternative names for the harem skirt/pants included jupe-sultane (sultan skirt), and jupe-pantalon (trouser-skirt). These designs were seen as controversial as Western women typically did not wear trousers. Poiret's explicit exoticism and references to Middle Eastern styles, using the imagery of harems and sultans to establish his Orientalist style, was widely regarded as immoral and inappropriately sexualised. Poiret himself insisted that he designed harem pants for the chic woman to show off "the harmony of her form and all the freedom of her native suppleness." Adam Geczy suggests that harem pants, as a direct cultural appropriation, represent the point at which Western fashion began seriously challenging traditional cultural claims to their own styles. Despite the fierce criticism from other designers such as Jeanne Paquin who specifically criticised how harem pants slumped rather than tapered at the ankle (unlike the hobble skirt), it was noted that Paquin's own collections showed signs of having been influenced by the new styles. Although Poiret is often credited with single-handedly inventing trousers for Western women, the couturier Jeanne Margaine-Lacroix presented wide-legged trousers in 1910, and a fellow couturier, Bourniche, is also credited with designing such styles at the time.

== Late 20th century ==
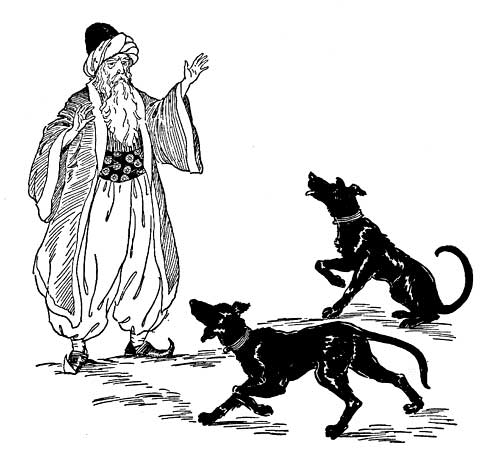
Harem pants shown in Arabian Nights

Harem pants came back into fashion in the 1980s, when they were remembered for being 'costumey.' A version of harem pants popularized in the late 1980s by M. C. Hammer became known as Hammer pants.

== Contemporary harem pants ==
Harem pants are commonly worn with a pleated skirt—a short skirt that covers the top portion of the harem pants. Both harem pants and pleated skirts are commonly used in belly dancing. Harem pants are also used as a look alike for a dhoti in India.

== See also ==
- Bloomers
- Elephant pants
- Hakama
- Parachute pants
