= Sharovary =

Kind of men's pants, part of the national clothes of Ukrainian Cossacks

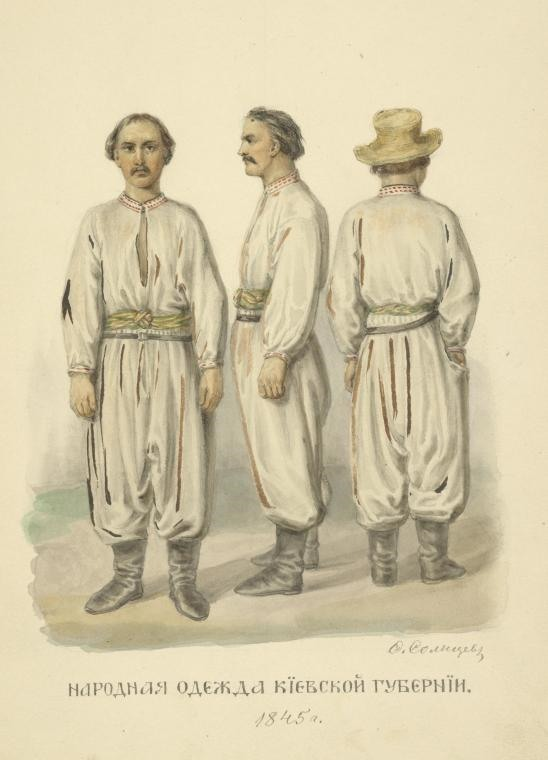
Folk garments of Kyiv Governorate, 1845

Sharovary (Ukrainian: шаровари) are a kind of loose traditional Ukrainian men's pants. The trousers are fitted at the waist and ankles, and loose at the hips and legs. They may be accompanied by a wide silk belt.

Similar pants in other cultures are sirwal, salwar, shalwar kameez, etc., and these are often translated as sharovary or shalvary in Russian and Ukrainian.

Sharovary are part of the stereotypical national clothes of Zaporozhian Cossacks.

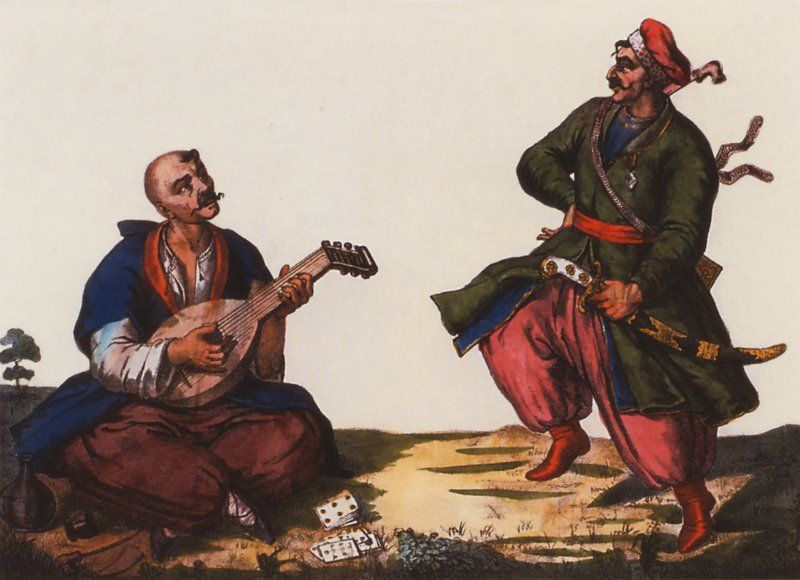
Ukrainian Cossacks wearing sharovary, 1760s

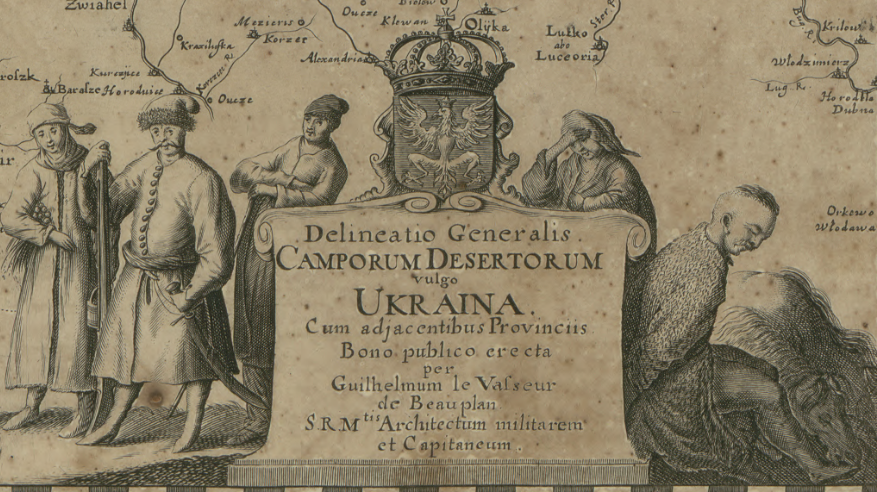
Ukrainian Cossacks, de Bauplan, 17th century

The presence of sharovary in the dress of the Zaporozhian Cossacks is noted by German ambassador Erich Lassota in the 16th century. A comprehensive description of Cossack dress is included in the 1651 book "Description d'Ukranie…" (Description of Ukraine...) by Polish-enlisted French-born cartographer and military engineer Guillaume Le Vasseur de Beauplan. Its translation mentions "sharovary", but narrow linen pants (d'un caleçó) were specified in the original instead.

Today sharovary is an important element of the Ukrainian culture. At the same time the word "sharovary" gave rise to the derogatory term "sharovarshchyna" for the pseudo-folk, kitsch steoretyping of the Ukrainian culture.

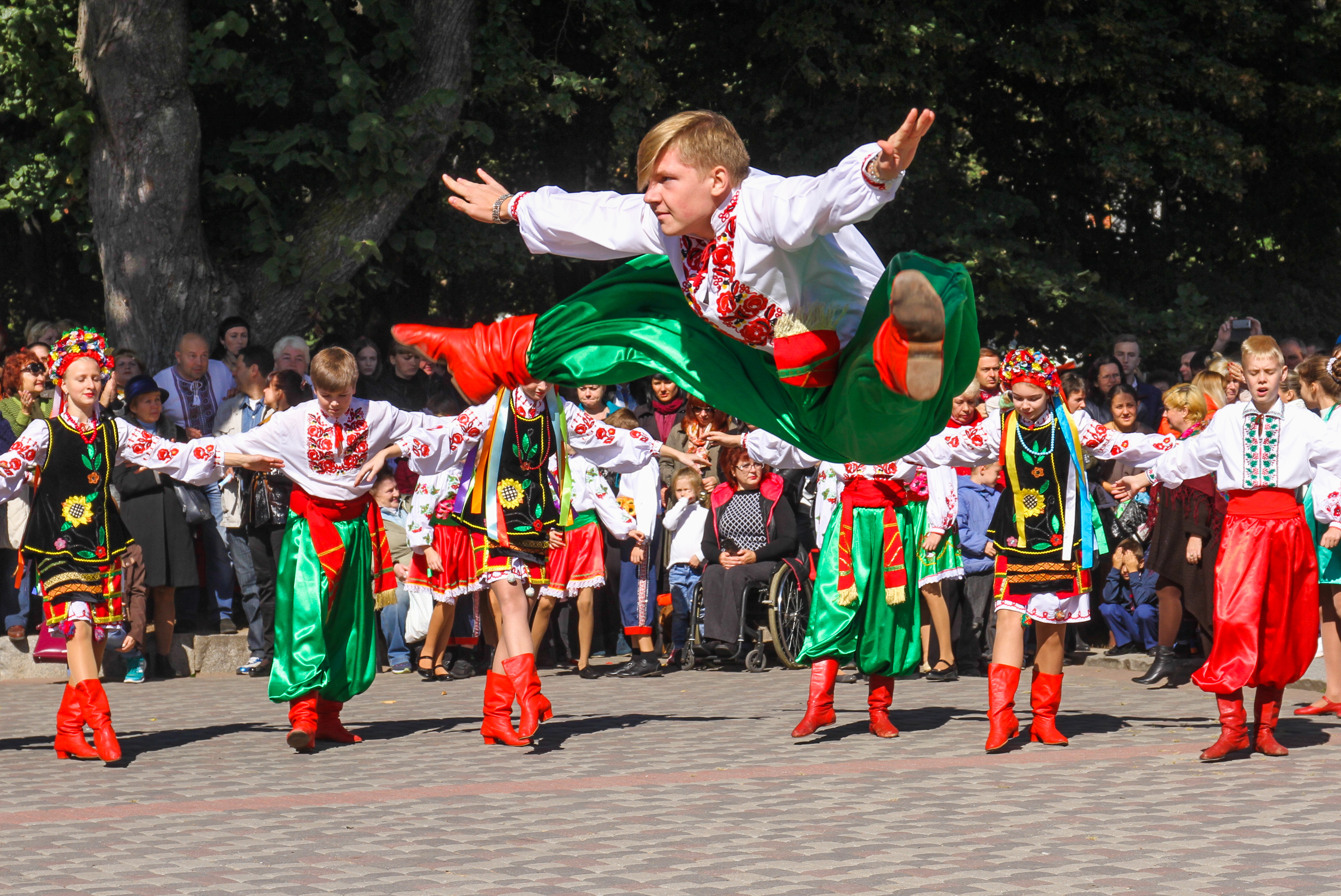
A 2016 parade of Ukrainian national dress

== See also ==
- European loose trousers
- Harem pants
- Turkish salvar

== Literature ==
- Nikolayeva T. History of costume. - Kyiv, Lybid 1996
