= Turkish folk dress =

Traditional clothing worn in Turkey

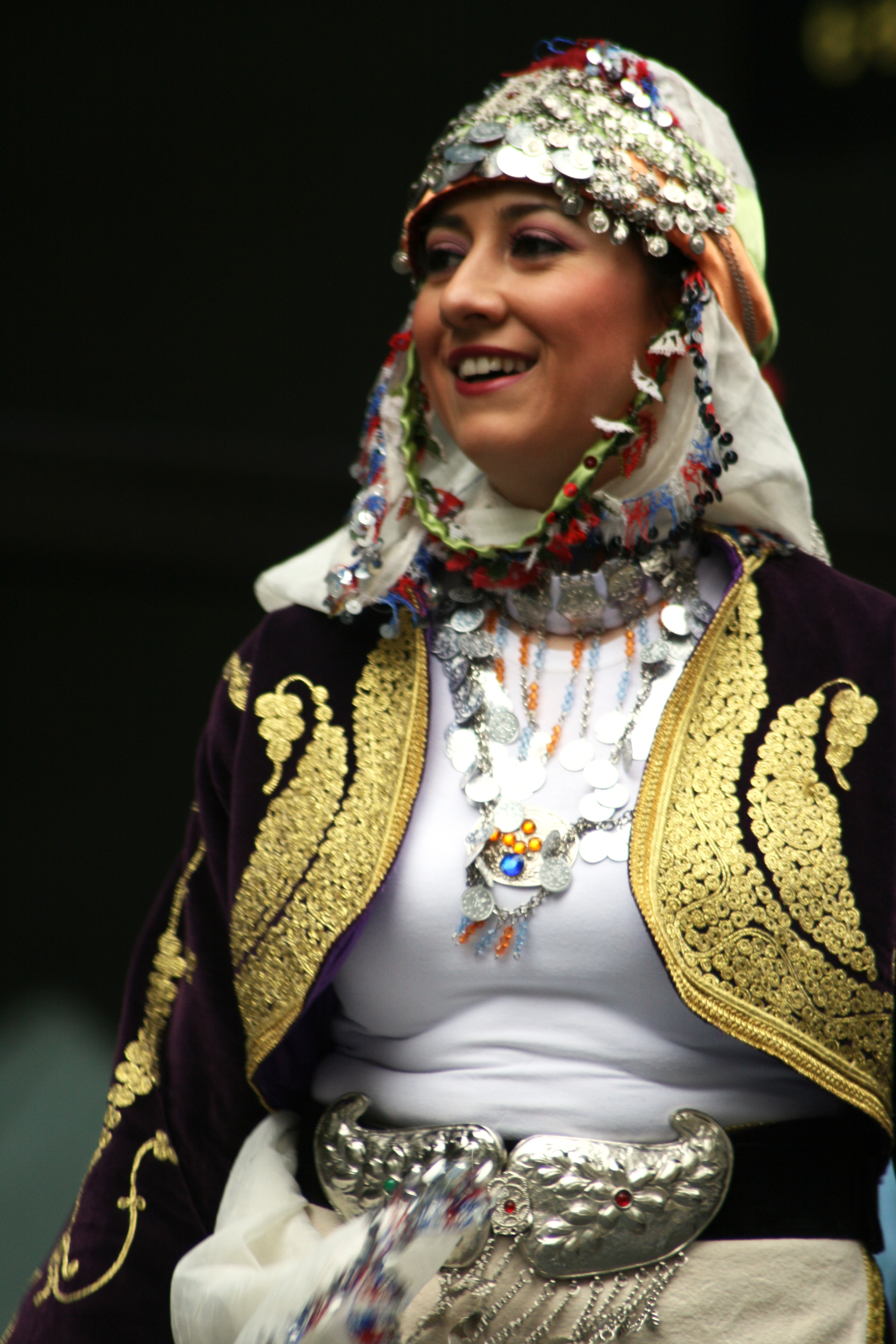
A Turkish folk dress

Turkish folk dress is a traditional style of varying folk clothing worn primarily in the rural parts of Turkey throughout the seven geographical regions of the country. Within the folk style of clothing are many variations and references that may be based on region, gender, ethnicity, the class of the wearer, culture and to a less extent religion.

Similar features that are present in most of these folk dress styles throughout of Turkey include the colorful stripes, baggy floral clothing, multiple layers, poulaines (çarık) and overall vibrant colors differing on the region. Heavily implied elements in these folk styles include nature, romance, folk music and patriotism.

== History and influences ==
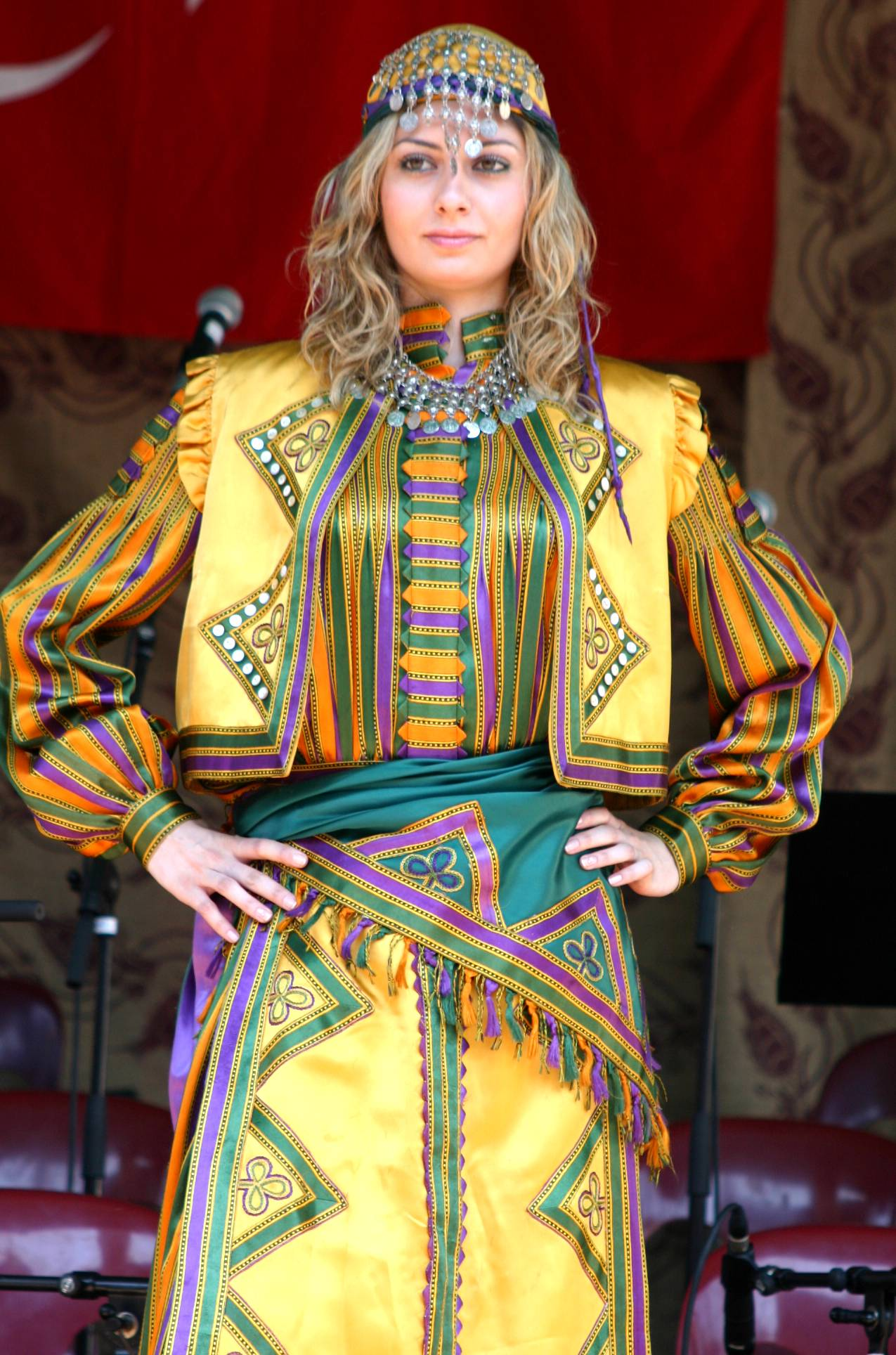
Turkish traditional fashion

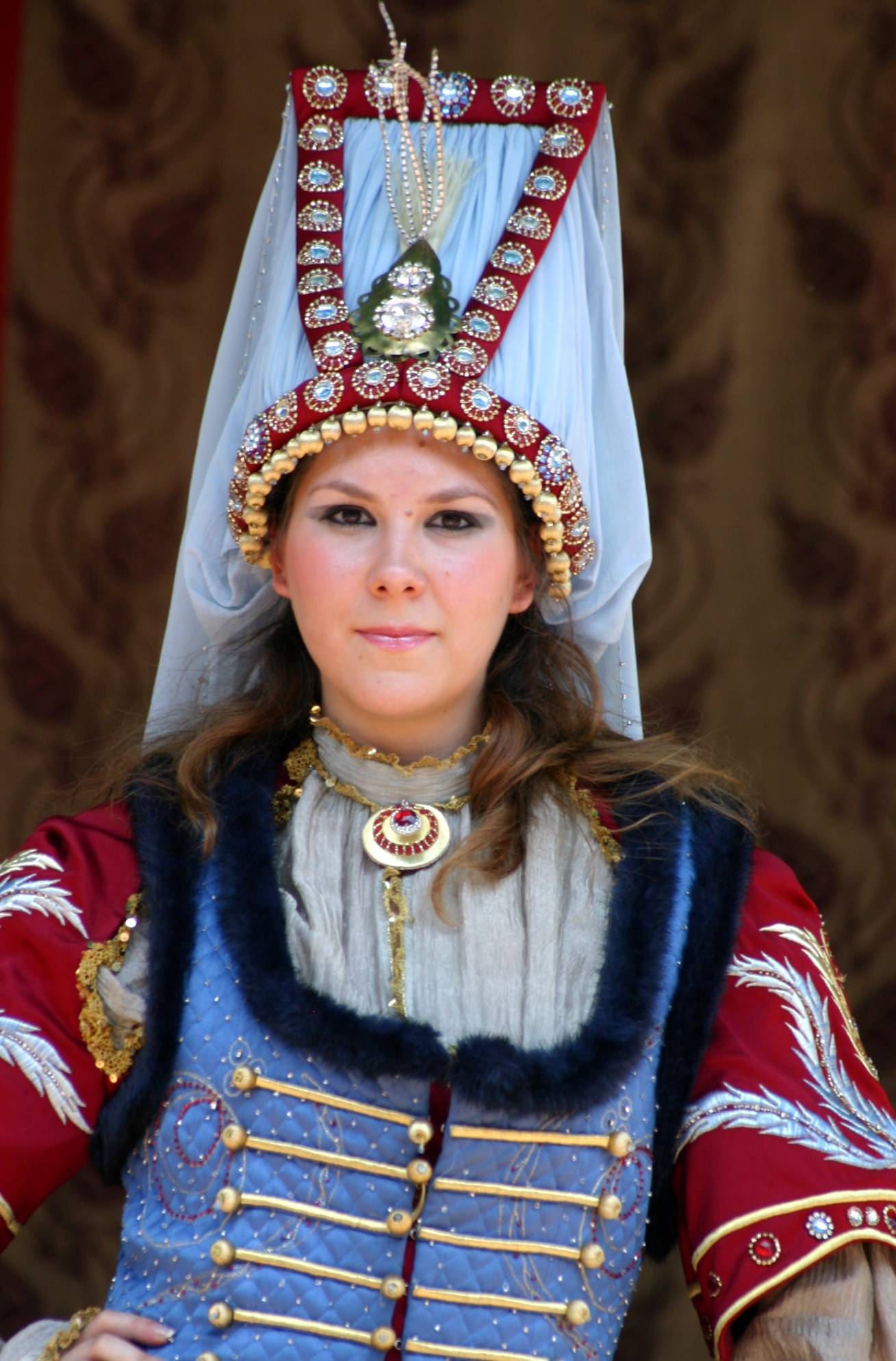
Turkish traditional fashion

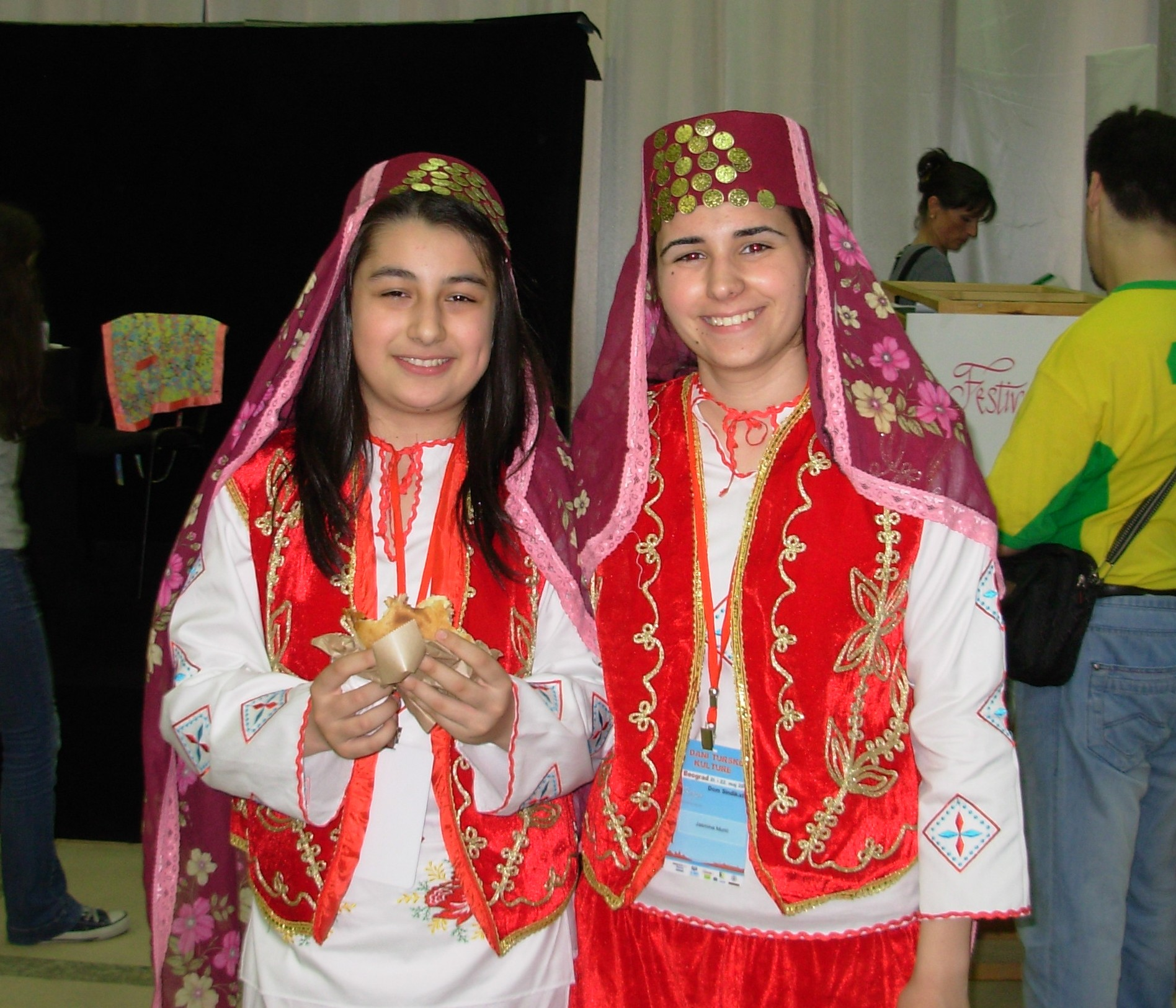
Turkish national costume

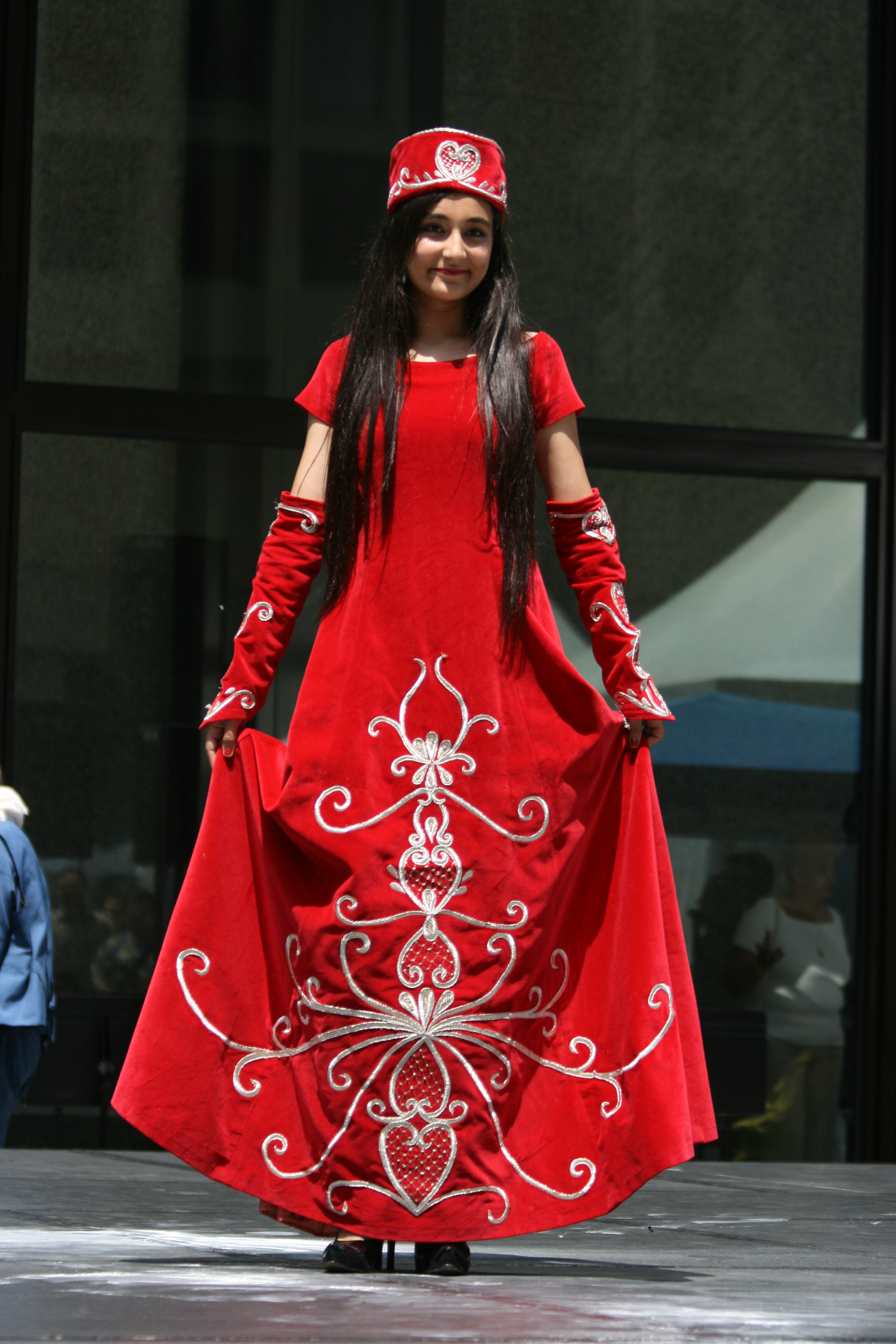
Turkish girl wearing red dress

=== Influences ===
Traditional folk clothing throughout Turkey today is heavily influenced by Ottoman fashion and based on the developments that occurred during and after the Empire’s reign. The borders of the Ottoman Empire encompassed the numerous individual cultures, people, religions and traditions that existed throughout Central Asia, Eastern Europe, Southern Europe, the Middle East, Central Europe, and Anatolia. Ottoman culture, and particularly Ottoman fashion evolved as an amalgam of these separate cultures and religions that had interacted over the past centuries of Ottoman reign.

“Ottoman culture” was used to define and generalize all present cultures and traditions within the empire, not the present or ruling Turkic culture specifically, though Turkic culture within the empire had ultimately embodied itself with other present Ottoman cultures and inherited many of its aspects, creating the basis of Turkish culture and diverse identity today. These set the stepping-stone for further developments of the Turkish culture that would continue on until the collapse and dissolution of Ottoman reign, and even after the establishment of the republic; Following several migration waves occurring into the country from Southern Europe (Albania and Greece), Eastern Europe (particularly Romania, Bulgaria and Yugoslavia), the Caucasus, and presently from the Middle East, Russia, and Ukraine.

=== History ===
Ottoman fashion had not disappeared following the collapse of the Ottoman Empire; as it remained as part of daily use and continued on to evolve within the several nations that emerged from the empire before and after the dissolution, including the newly established Republic of Turkey. Some notable features and dress of Ottoman fashion included the mintan, a heavily embroidered chainse or vest; a şalvar, embroidered baggy pants; the sarık, a large, wrapped headpiece usually differing from a traditional turban and region-to-region; and the entari, a long flowy embroidered dress worn typically by women in the empire.

Although the notable Fez was also used by non-Muslim communities within the empire without religious intent, it was one of the earliest to fall out of fashion in these regions following the collapse with the sarık, including Turkey, after the official ban of the headwear in 1925. Though the sarık remained in-use by Muslim communities in former Ottoman lands and the rural areas of Turkey.

Modern Turkish folk dress throughout Turkey today lacks most of the religious aspects of these dress due to governmental pressure and restrictions applied throughout the 20s and late 30s, though has inherited a significant portion of other features with small modifications to a lesser extent. Similar features of modern Turkish folk dress throughout Turkey include: the mintan, şalvar, entari, gömlek/bluz (blouse), çarık, kuşak (similar to a girdle, cloth waist-wrap, or cincture), mendil (similar to a neckerchief) and yelek (a vest).

== Turkish folk styles ==
Folk clothing in Turkey embodies the crossing over and interaction of the various cultures in and around Anatolia, and the fashion of each region in Turkey tends to reflect the nature of its people, their interactions and their traditions.

=== Eastern Anatolia ===
Eastern Anatolian fashion reflects elements of the neighboring Kurdish, Armenian, Persian, Azeri cultures, such as overall clothing with floral prints, stylish head and face coverings for women, alongside the wide belts for men with floral baggy trousers. Such Turkish fashion styles are mostly influenced by the Kurdish, Armenian, and Persian cultures, but rather distinct from the cultures themselves.

=== Black Sea, Northern Anatolia ===
The traditional fashion of the Black Sea region is bold and proud-spirited, seen in its deep colors, vibrant and vivid patterns usually referencing the nature of the Pontic Alps, and sportfulness, with an element of patriotism. It is heavily influenced by the Pontic Greeks, Laz, Georgian, Circassian and other Caucasian cultures, including some historical elements of Russian culture which was present in the region during Tsarist and Soviet reign.

=== Thrace and Marmara Regions ===
Prominent in the geographically European (Thrace) and northwestern parts (Marmara) of the country, with large populations of Balkan migrants throughout history. Influenced by Bulgarian, Greek, and to a lesser extent Serbian, Romanian, and Bosnak folk culture. All types of Turkish Thracian folk culture are prominently found in Tekirdağ, while the Marmara region itself is home to several spread-out folk subcultures and is not considered a singular distinct folk style itself.

=== Central Anatolian ===
Influenced by traditional Turkic culture and folk, while also having great influence over most other diverse folk styles across Turkish folk dress.

=== Aegean Coast, Western Anatolia ===
Influenced by Inner Anatolian and Greek folk styles.

=== Mediterranean and Southern Anatolia regions ===
Influenced by other Anatolian.

== State supervision and control of dress ==
After the collapse of the Ottoman reign and the establishment of the Republic of Turkey, the new Kemalist regime which assumed power in 1923, implemented strict policies of modernization, westernization and secularization in all aspects of Turkish society, including clothing styles. In 1925, the state announced a law by decree which specified that the clothing that was to be worn by civil servants and officers was not to be traditional wear, while the law also enforced a ban on the fez for servants and later citizens, the notable classic symbol of the Ottoman era.

The majority of the policies were aimed at reducing religious influence, significance and resemblance within the majority Muslim society of the country, but was also greatly enforced on other religious minority groups as well, causing significant cultural damage.

Rulings like these were abided and enforced heavier in the larger urban cities of Turkey, but they had less of an impact in the Turkish countryside and rural areas without enforcement and supervision, where traditional Turkish styles, particularly in men's dress – while incorporating some Western features, like the trouser and the cap, – remained alive and diverse.
