= Elephant pants =

Style of trousers from Thailand

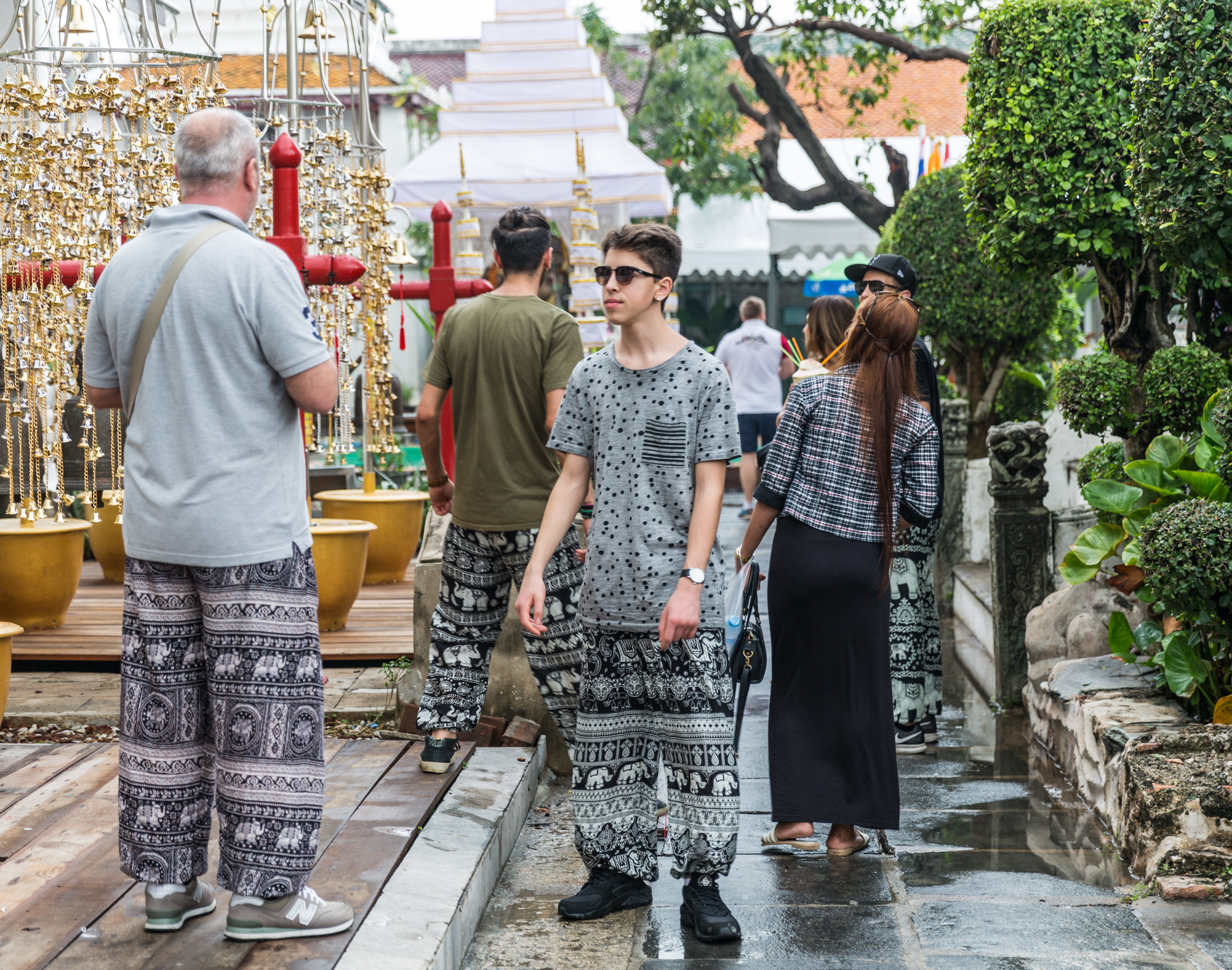
Tourists wearing elephant pants at Wat Arun in Bangkok

Elephant pants (Thai: กางเกงช้าง, RTGS: kangkeng chang) are a style of loose-fitting trousers made of a light-weight fabric featuring printed elephant patterns. They are mainly sold in Thailand, as well as other countries in Southeast Asia, and have mostly been associated with backpackers, but since 2022 they have also seen a surge in popularity among local Thais.

== History ==
The origins of elephant pants are poorly documented, though they were already common in 2013, when Chiang Mai-based Chinrada Garment, one of the item's largest manufacturers, began producing them. Although they are not traditional and were not worn by locals, they gained popularity among foreign tourists, who perceived them as an authentic experience. They became widely sold in tourist areas such as Khaosan Road, as well as near major tourist attractions such as the Grand Palace and Buddhist temples, where they served as a convenient way to meet dress code requirements. By the late 2010s, elephant pants had become a stereotype of backpackers travelling in Thailand and wider Southeast Asia.

The popularity of elephant pants briefly caught attention among Thais in 2019, when several K-pop idols were seen wearing them. Following a lull due to the COVID-19 pandemic, they saw a resurgence in 2022, with their use by celebrities as well as viral trends on TikTok driving their popularity among young Thais. Further promotion by Thai social media influencers led to elephant pants becoming a major fashion trend in 2023, with high-end brands also producing luxury counterparts, and manufacturers also began creating other garments featuring the patterns. Local manufacturers latched onto the trend, producing patterns showcasing their province's icons, and the government also promoted them as part of its soft power policy. In early 2024, concerns over lower-quality Chinese-made items flooding the market led to widespread public debate over intellectual property protection.

== Description ==
Elephant pants are made of a light fabric, typically spun rayon or a polyester blend known in Thai as "Italian silk", printed with monochromatic patterns (most often black and white, but also other colours) featuring elephants. They are wide-legged and loose-fitting, with an elastic waistband, and often also feature elastic hems at the ankles, making them similar in shape to harem pants.
