= Sirwal =

Loose trousers of ancient origin

19th century Ottomans dressed with Shalvar

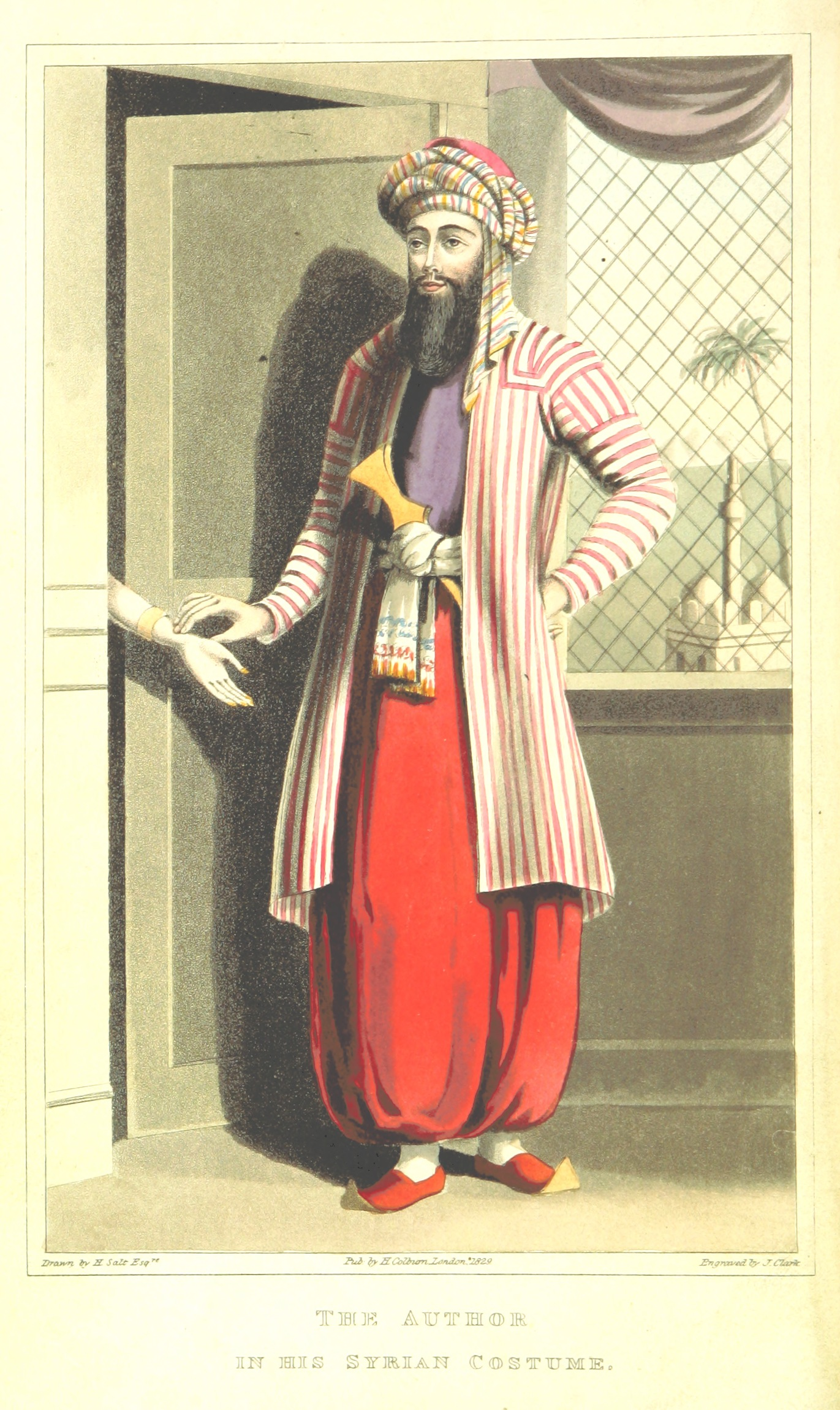
(1829) MADDEN, Richard Robert wearing Ottoman-style Shalvar in Syria

Sirwal, also sherwal, saroual, seroual, sarouel or serouel (Arabic: سِرْوَال sirwāl), (Note: Persian: شلوار (šalvâr) Kurdish: شه‌واڵ (shawal) Tat: şalvar Urdu: شلوار (shalwâr) Turkish: şalvar Azerbaijani: şalvar Kazakh: шалбар (şalbar) Serbo-Croatian: (шалваре) Bengali: সালোয়ার (shalwar)) also known, in some contexts, as (a subtype of) Harem pants, are a form of trousers. The word is of Persian origin; shalwār (شلوار) was borrowed into Greek as σαράβαρα sarábāra, "loose trousers worn by Scythians". The words used in Balkan languages came through the Ottoman Turks and did not continue the Ancient Greek designation. They are typically worn in Muslim countries, but also extensively in the Polish Commonwealth, in Mallorca, in the Greek countryside, and other places in the Balkans that were influenced by Ottoman Turks prior to World War I. The trousers are not originally an Arab garment but were introduced from Persia to other Mideastern regions. The sirwal is also worn by communities in North India.

The drawstring allows the sirwal to be worn at either the waist or hip level.

== Types ==
It is usually made from cotton, linen, or polyester. Sometimes the cuff features embroidery.

There are two types of sirwal, long and short. Short sarawil are worn by most Saudi men. Men of the Western Region usually wear long sarawil.

== Uniforms ==
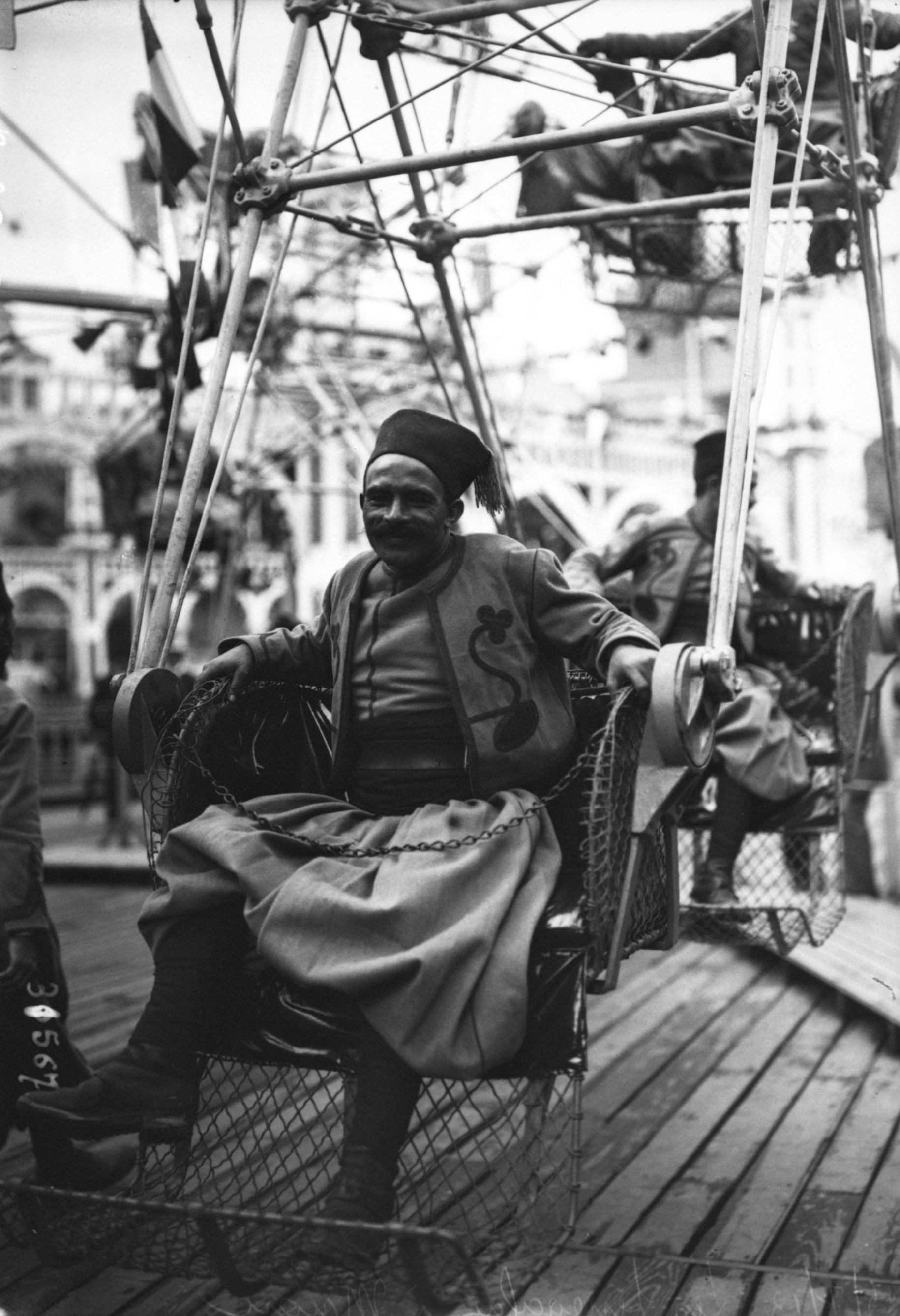
Algerian soldier of the French Army wearing seroual trousers as part of his zouave style uniform 1913.

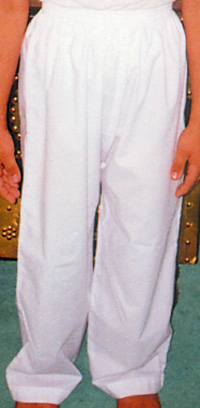
Long, white Sirwal

The seroual formed part of the standard uniform for the Mameluke squadrons of Napoleon's Imperial Guard, and for the North African zouave, spahi and tirailleur regiments of the French Army from 1830 to 1962. The French Army version of the seroual was notable for being cut so widely that it did not require two separate trouser legs. During the American Civil War a number of volunteer regiments, designated as zouaves, also wore seroual breeches, though these were usually of chasseur design, being simply baggier versions of conventional trousers.

== See also ==
- Pajamas
- Sharovary
- Turkish salvar
