= Turkish salvar =

Traditional baggy trousers of Turkey

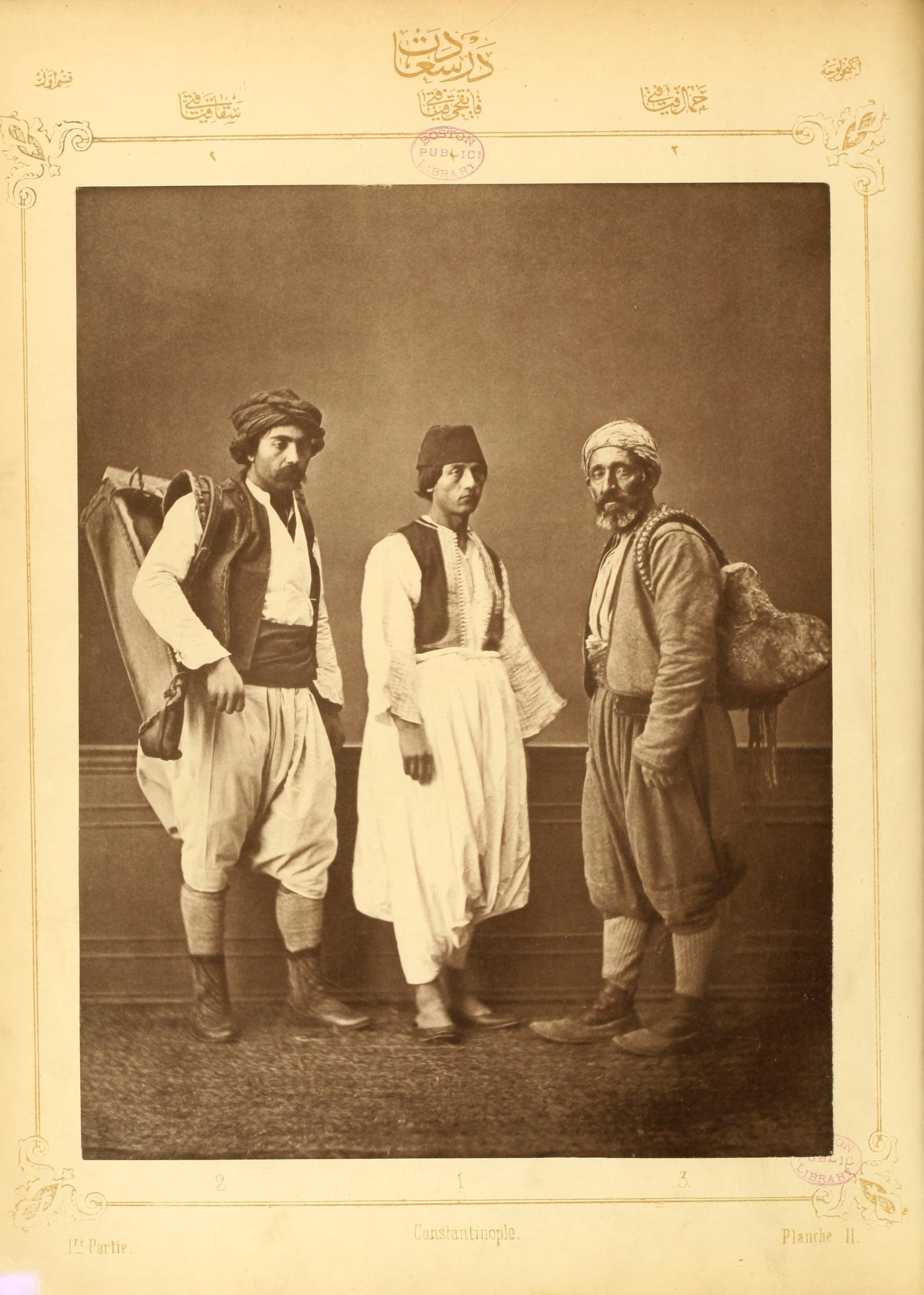
Men wearing salvar in Istanbul in 1873, studio photo

Turkish şalvar (pronounced shalvar, Turkish: [ʃalˈvaɾ]), Turkish trousers or dimiye are traditional baggy trousers gathered in tightly at the ankle. They are part of Turkish folk dress.

Men may wear the traditional loose coat, called jubba, over the şalvar. Other upper garments are also worn over or under the şalvar.

Mustafa Kemal Atatürk Westernized the dress code in Turkey in the 1920s as part of his reforms. However, men and women still wear the şalvar in many areas of Turkey, indifferent to social status.

Similar pants in other cultures include the tshalvar, schalwar, salwar kameez, patiala salwar, shintijan, sirwal, sharovary, aladdin pants, balloon pants, drop crotch pants, pantaloons, zouave, tobi trousers, pluderhose and pumphose.

== Origins ==
The etymology comes from the Greek word saravara (Greek: σαράβαρα), which is in turn a borrowing from the Scythian *šarabāra, both meaning "Scythian trousers," possibly indicating to it having been introduced with the nomadic culture of the Turkic peoples, being rooted in heavy Turco-Scythic syncretism.

== In female dress ==
The traditional clothing for women of Turkey includes the şalvar which is usually worn with upper garments of varying styles and lengths. The traditional şalvar suits are a part of Turkey's culture back to the Ottoman era. The şalvars are of varying degrees of bagginess and are gathered at the ankle. Bright colours and flowered prints are favoured by rural women. The total female ensemble includes the gömlek (chemise), şalvar and entari (robe).

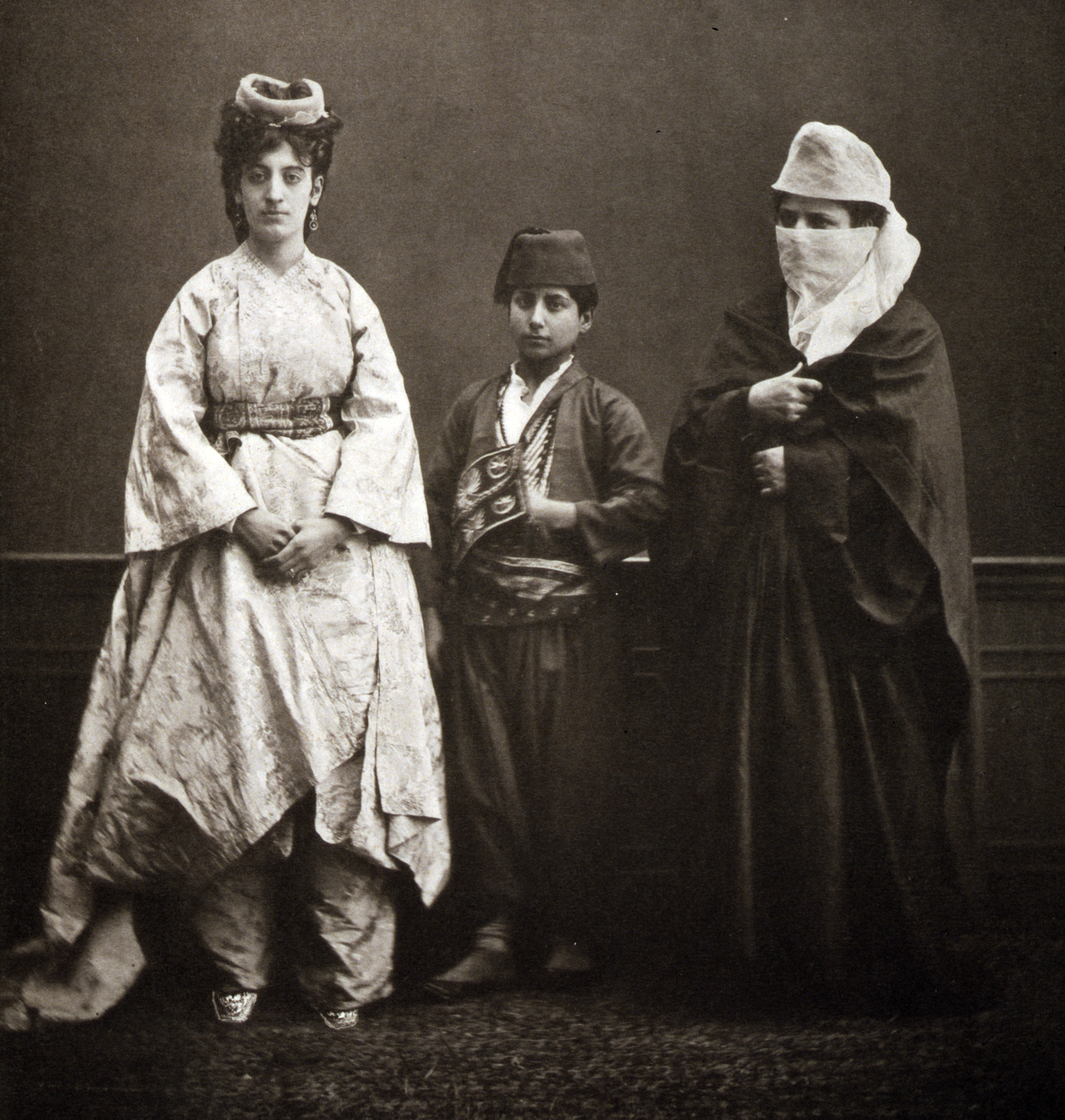
Studio portrait of models wearing traditional clothing from Istanbul, Ottoman Empire

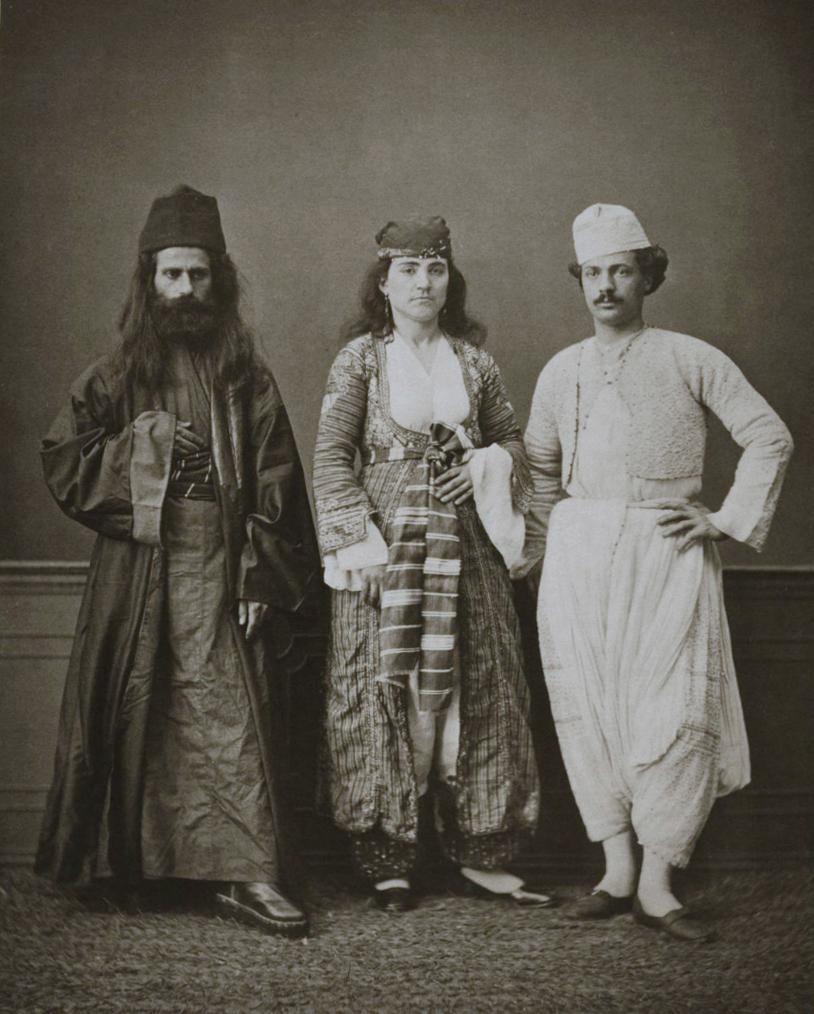
Greek Christian Ottomans of Cyprus, 19th century

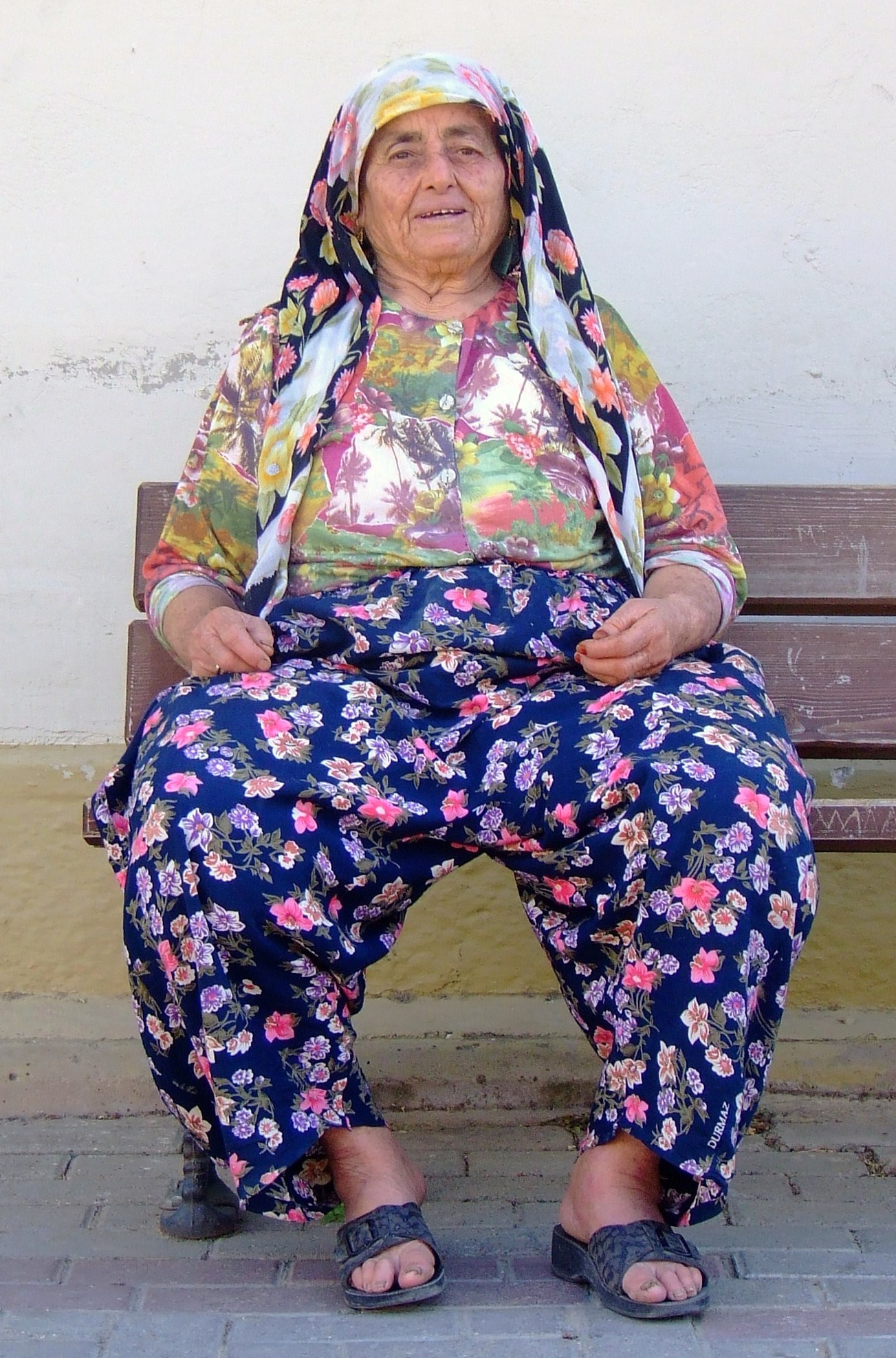
Traditional Turkish dress in Selçuk, pre-2007

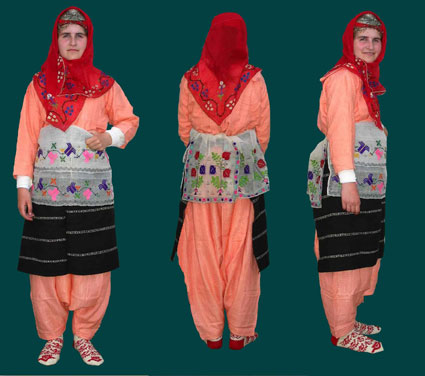
Traditional Turkish dress worn in General Kiselvo, Bulgaria

== In male dress ==
The traditional male dress includes the şalvar, yelek (vest) and cebken (jacket). The men's salvar is popular in southern Turkey, especially in the villages of Cilicia, and the districts of Urfa and Diyarbakir.

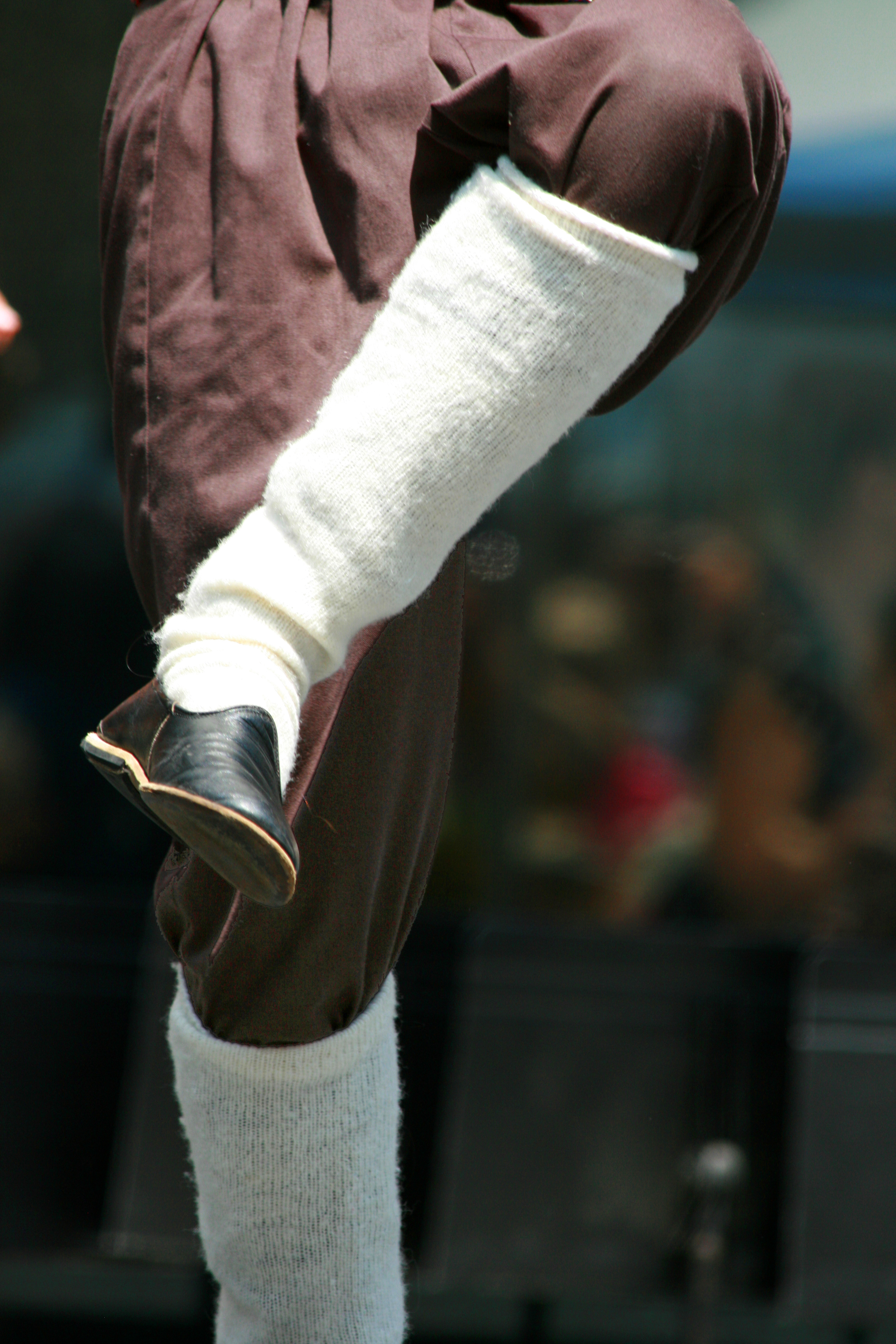
Turkish trousers with over the calf socks

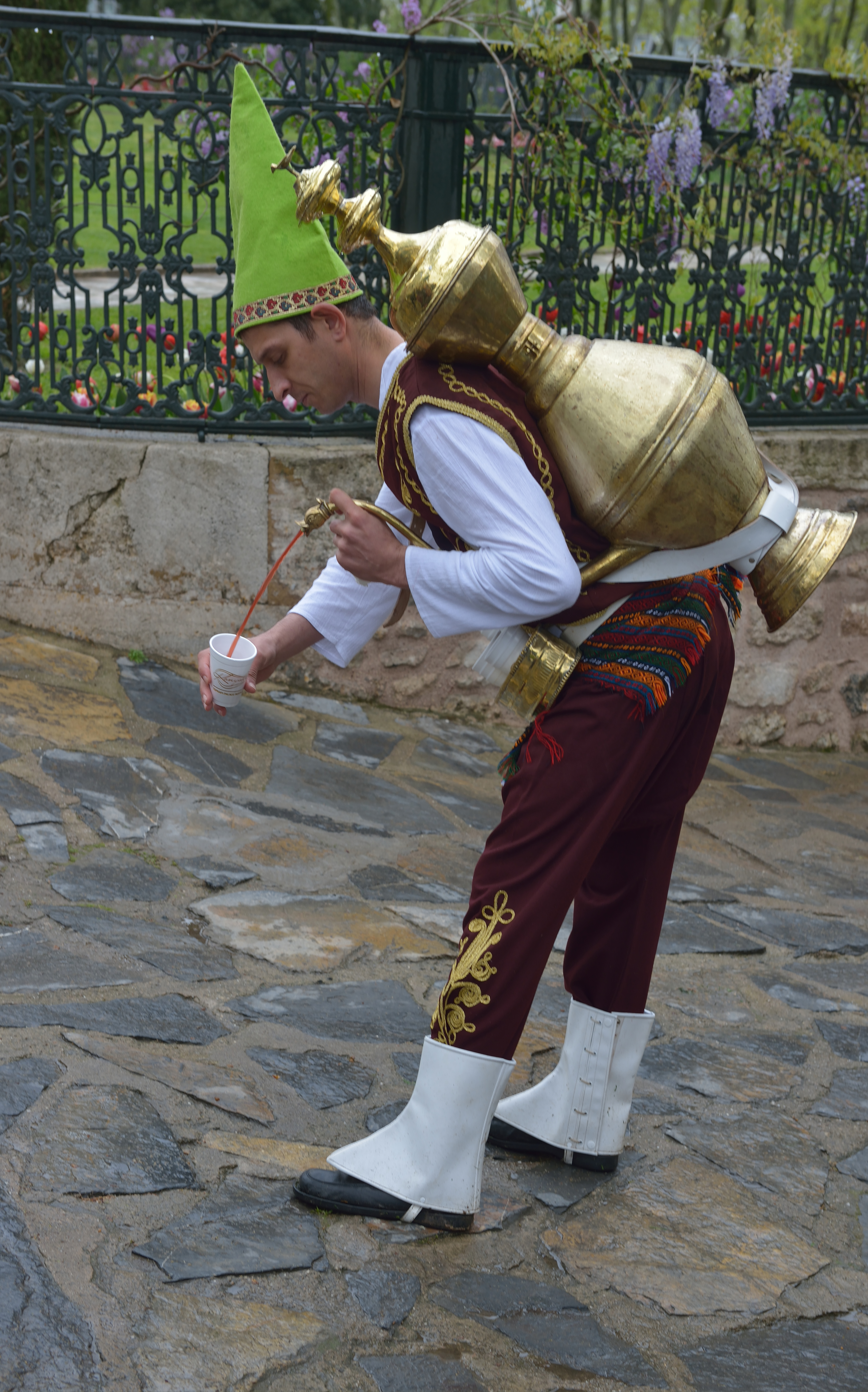
Samovar bearer in Istanbul

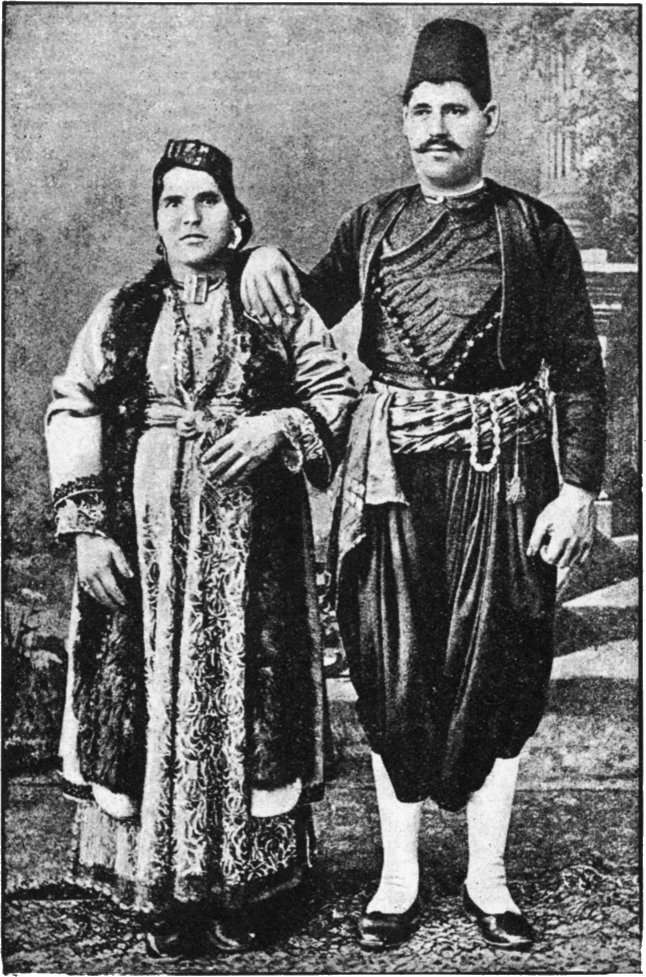
Jewish Ottomans, end of the 19th century

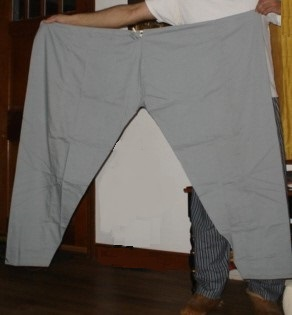
One cut of salwar

== See also ==
- Knickerbockers
- Bloomers
- Harem pants
