= Sharovarshchyna =

Various cultural stereotypes about Ukrainians

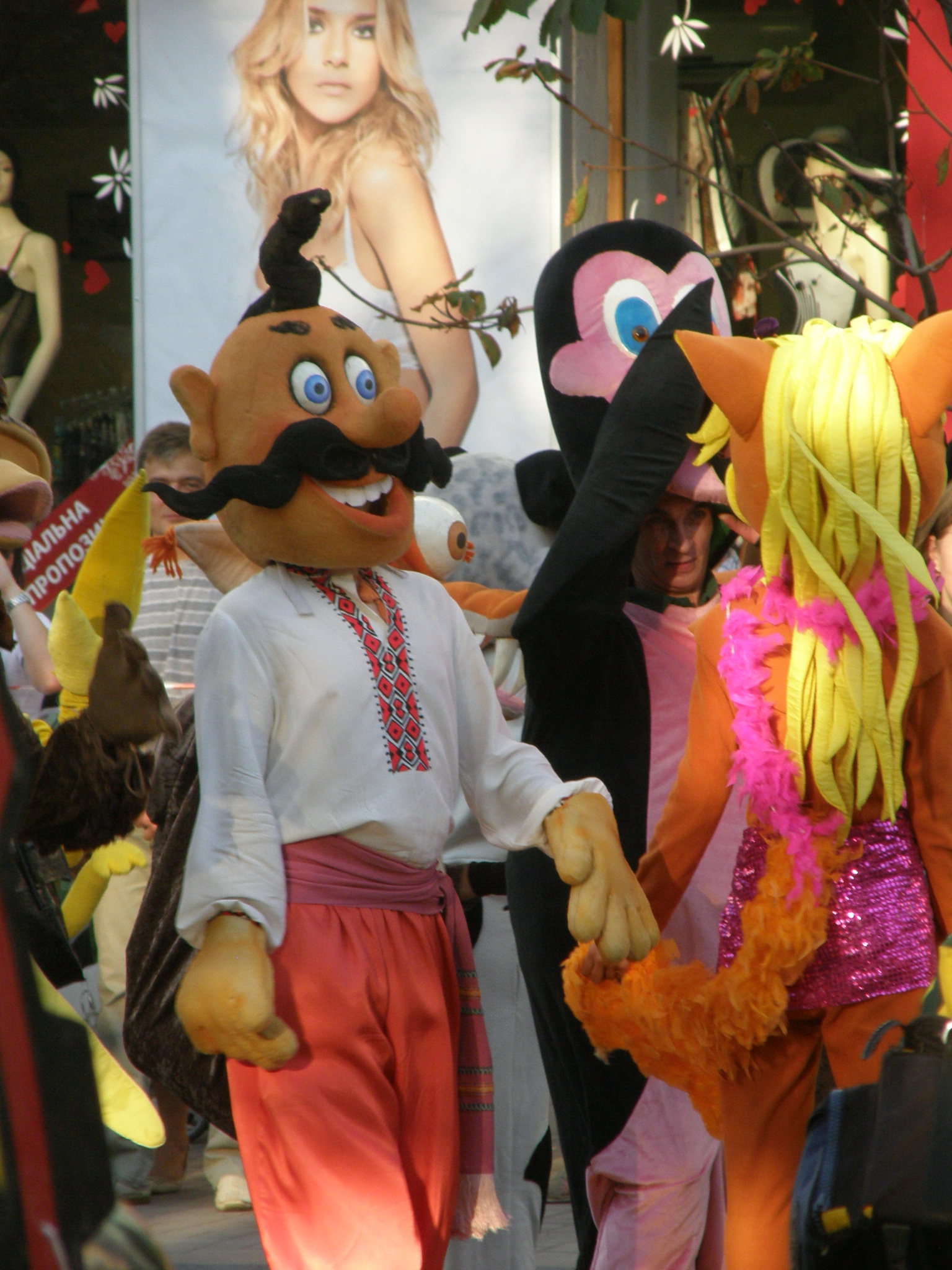
An example of sharovarshchyna in public entertainment events in Ukraine

Sharovarshchyna (Ukrainian: шароварщина [ʃɐroˈwɑrʃtʃɪnɐ]; also sharovarstvo [шароварство] or sharovarnytstvo [шароварництво]; from sharovary, stereotypical Cossack pants) is a culturological and journalistic term, usually negative, for the ethnic stereotype of Ukrainian culture through pseudo-folk, kitsch elements of costume and life. Sharovarshchyna identifies Ukrainian culture with the culture of the peasants and Cossacks, relying on their folklore and theatrical image popularized in the late 19th century. The heyday of sharovarshchyna and the popularization of this term, however, took place in the second half of the twentieth century.

== Characteristics ==
Sharovarshchyna is usually understood as an imitation of folk peasant culture that substitutes for authentic culture. Sharovarshchyna creates the impression that Ukrainian culture is entirely peasant in origin and cannot go beyond folk peasant culture; that modern phenomena and art trends are impossible in it, but exist only as layers of other cultures. An example would be a situation where at one event only folk songs are performed in Ukrainian, with all other entries being performed in Russian. This creates the impression that Ukrainian culture is backward, cannot develop, and exists only as an imitation of the past. Ukrainian cultural critic Yulia Nikishenko and journalist Viktoria Yermolaeva define "sharovarshchyna" as "a way of representing Ukrainian culture and Ukrainian identity with the help of pseudo-folk peasant and/or Cossack clothing and elements of everyday life.".

Sharovarshchyna is characterized by the substitution of folk costumes and jewelry for stage costumes. In particular, red trousers, which historically Ukrainians did not wear, are shown as stereotypical folk costumes; shirts made of synthetic fabric, glossy satin skirts, plastic wreaths, wooden beads; decorating clothes with stylized flowers in overly bright colors and uncharacteristic patterns. Sharovarshchyna diminishes the diversity of Ukrainian clothing, reducing it to a few standardized patterns. Other components of sharovarshchyna are the excessive rise in popularity of hopak, presentation of stage dances as folk dances, shifting the emphasis of wedding ceremonies to feasting; representation of Ukrainian cuisine as limited to vodka, salo, borsch, and varenyky.

According to ethnographer Halyna Bondarenko and anthropologist Tina Polek, sharovarshchyna is characterized by imitation of traditional culture, festivalism with a commercial bias, situationalism (a cultural phenomenon becomes sharovarshchyna only in a certain context), and going to opposite extremes. This makes it similar to kitsch.

== Origin of the term ==
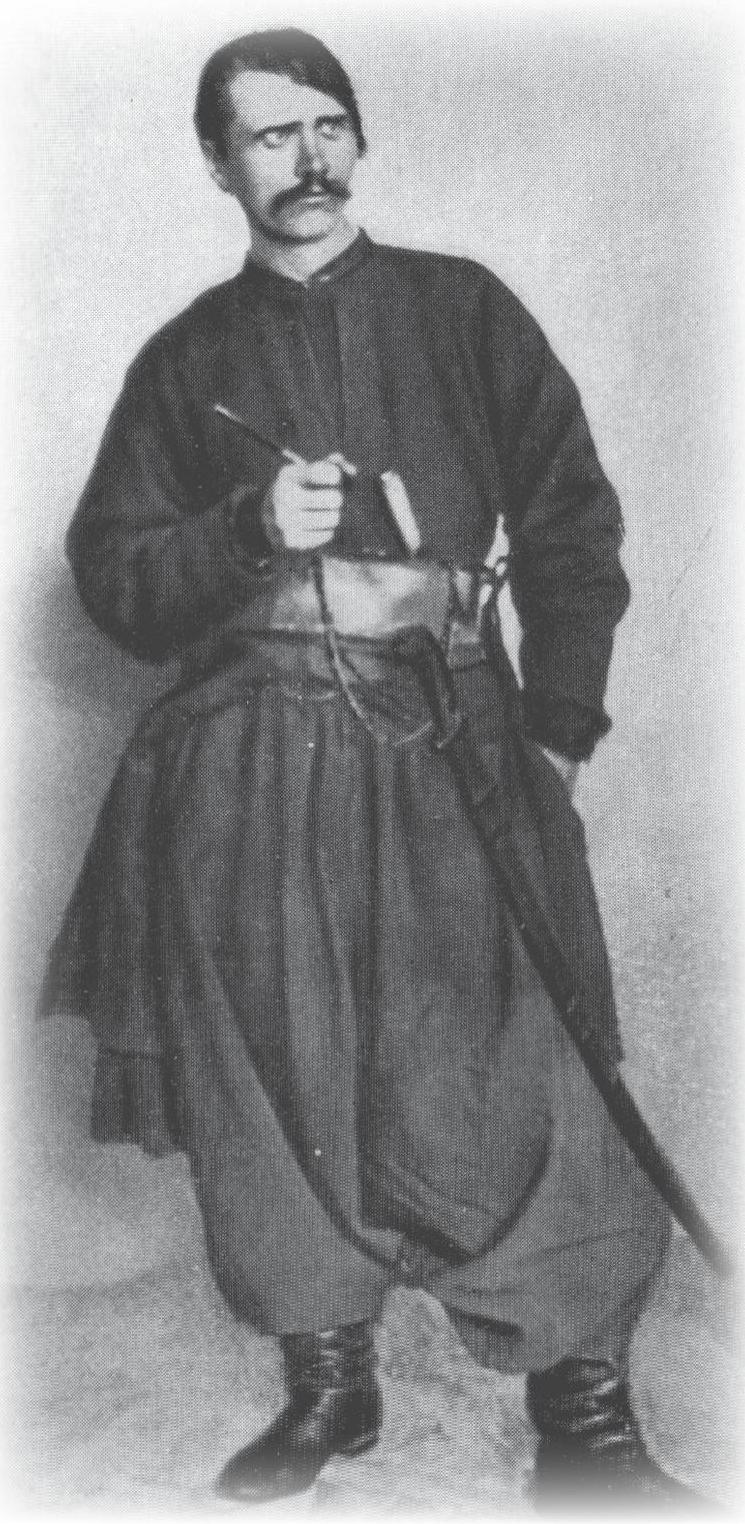
Dmytro Yavornytskyi as a Cossack, circa 1885-1890 pp.

The first use of the word sharovarshchyna is not recorded. According to the Ukrainian emigrant educator Hryhorii Vashchenko, the term comes from the Bolsheviks. The word is present in Soviet journalism of the "Perestroika" era of the 1980s, in particular, in Ukrainian it was used by the poet and journalist Oleksa Yushchenko.

However, the Ukrainian cultural critic Anatolii Makarov specifies the practice of "sharovarshchyna" originated first with the so-called "halushnyky" (from "halushky"), which refers to certain Kyiv conservatives of the late nineteenth century who "organized applause at performances of semi-balagan troupes that passed off marketplace farces as Ukrainian national drama.". In any case, the phenomenon of representing Ukrainian culture through exclusively peasant life was already known and criticized in the 1890s. It was noticed by Ivan Franko, Lesya Ukrainka, Symon Petliura. Regarding the primitive ethnography common in Naddniprianshchyna in the pre-revolutionary Russian Empire, Mykola Khvylovyi coined the term "prosvityanshchyna" (from prosvitnytstvo, which refers to Prosvita enlightenment societies). "Prosvityanshchyna" was characterized as peasant-looking theatrical performances by amateur bands and acting troupes.

The concept of sharovarshchyna is often associated with wide trousers, Cossack sharovary, which became known as a stereotypical Cossack garment due to the work of nineteenth-century ethnographers, in particular Dmytro Yavornytskyi. The ideas he expressed in his book "Zaporizhzhia in the Remains of Antiquity and Traditions of the People" (1888), published with the financial support of Ukrainian philanthropist and collector Vasyl Tarnovsky, became the basis for the romanticized image of the Cossack. This image (wide red trousers, vyshyvanka and chub) was picked up and replicated by traveling theater groups. This was also facilitated by an erroneous translation of the book by the French engineer and military cartographer Guillaume Levasseur de Beauplan "Description d'Ukranie..." (1660), which mentions "sharovary", but narrow linen pants were specified in the original instead.

Another version connects the sharovarshchyna with the activities of the Ukrainian director Borys Sharvarko, who since 1977 has organized concerts and shows at public expense, where "modern" Ukrainian music was presented with songs in Russian and Russian performers. Hence the variant "Sharvarkivshchyna".

== Sharovarshchyna in Soviet Ukraine ==
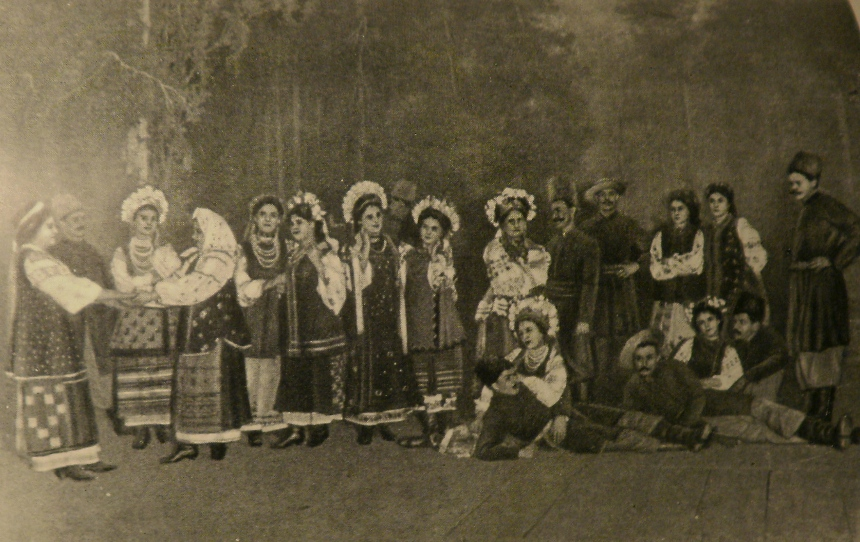
Stage costumes had a significant impact on the formation of the "sharovarshchyna" (a scene from M. Starytskyi's play Drowned, 1964 р.

Some researchers attribute the emergence of sharovarshchyna to the end of the nineteenth century, but most recognize the Soviet era as the time of its emergence or intensification. According to Halyna Bondarenko and Tina Polek, sharovarshchyna appears when folk culture becomes commercially successful, when there is a demand for it.

In 1930, Joseph Stalin defined Soviet culture as "national in form and socialist in content", Therefore, the replacement of authentic folk costumes of the union peoples with pseudo-folk costumes became one of the main elements of the cultural policy of the USSR. The most prominent examples of sharovarshchyna in the Soviet period are the film-performance "In the Steppes of Ukraine" (1952, directed by Yura Hnat), which describes the story of two collective farm chairmen, Halushka and Chasnyk, against the background of a fake, idyllic image of Ukrainian nature, where the main characters in pseudo-folk vyshyvankas convey not so much the character of the "advanced" people of the Soviet Union, but the "Little Russian" image of Ukrainians.

The protagonists of the film-performance "Pharaohs" (1964) (directed by Isaak Shmaruk) wear the same pseudo-folk embroideries, which confirms the assertion of many researchers about the "provincialism" of the image of Ukrainian culture within the USSR. In particular, Oleksandr Riznyk writes: "The "showcase" function of folklore in the USSR was complemented by its provincializing function, which reflected the doctrine of the futility of all national languages and cultures of the USSR, except Russian. While the latter was still allowed to be "universal" in its themes and means of expression, other cultures had to be "nationally colored," which in practice meant preserving them in archaic forms. This is how the phenomenon of a primitivized "sharovary culture" emerged.

Since 1977, the main director of festivals and cultural programs in the Soviet Union was Borys Sharvarko, whose name is also associated with the popularization of sharovarshchyna. The sharovarshchyna became entrenched in the culture in the 1970s and 1980s. Folk choirs contributed to its spread, including Veryovka Choir or the Kyiv Song Theater "Dzherela", which, with their stage costumes and repertoire, formed a distorted view of Ukrainian folk culture as a relic of the past.

== Sharovarshchyna in present-day Ukraine ==
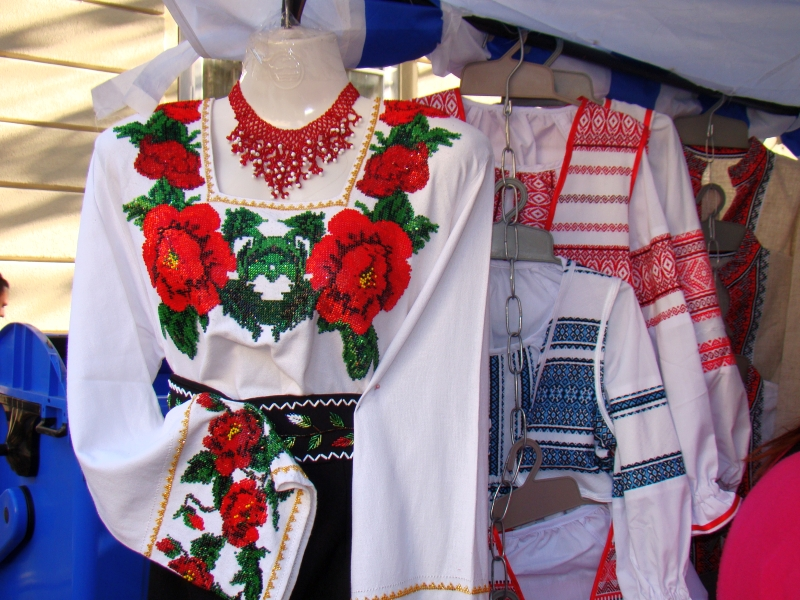
One of the features of "sharovarshchyna" is bright, atypical for traditional clothing patterns

With the development of commercial activity in independent Ukraine, sharovarshchyna has spread to advertising, ethnic restaurants, souvenirs, soap operas, etc., which in one way or another use "nationally colored" elements. Modern examples of sharovarshchyna are concerts by Mykhailo Poplavskyi - songs "Salo", "Varenychky", as well as productions by studios like "Kvartal-95", works by Anatoliy Hnatiuk, Oksana Pekun, the band "Lisapetnyi Batalion", which are imitated by numerous amateur bands.

The image and performances of Verka Serdyuchka fit into the "sharovary" image, although it is sometimes noted that that is a postmodernist character. Sometimes the so-called "Cossack rock" performed by the bands "Haidamaky" and "Tin Sontsia" could also be considered to be "sharovarshchyna". The stereotypical image of Ukrainians is promoted in the movie "Crazy Wedding".

In the 2000s, sharovarshchyna was complemented by the sexualization of Ukrainian women in folk costumes. The components of her image include a loose shirt, large neckline, no necklace, and uncovered head. A popular souvenir was motanka dolls, but sewn instead of wound.

Sharovarshchyna is widely manifested in the so-called "Cossack fantasy". Although the legacy of Nikolai Gogol has cemented the connection of the Cossacks with mysticism and fantasy, the historical context of the emergence of the Ukrainian nation is important. Western fantasy is more based on the romanticized image of the Middle Ages, while the Cossacks are from the early modern period. While the source of inspiration for Western fantasy authors was often fakes of national epics, for Ukrainian authors it was historical novels more distant from mythology (for example, the novel Black Council) or deliberately artistic treatments of the Cossack theme (as in part "Kobzar").

In context of the Russian-Ukrainian war, numerous business projects have emerged since 2014 that use authentic ancient embroidery to create modern products. These projects could be considered to be destroying the folk products that had survived until then to alter them into hoodies or ecobags.

A related phenomenon is "bayraktarshchyna" (from song "Bayraktar"), a similar one-sided comic coverage of the Russian-Ukrainian war in Ukrainian mass culture.

== Assessments of the phenomenon ==
Historian, political scientist, and public figure Mykola Tomenko wrote in 1996 that Ukrainians need their own government to raise their own national culture. If the government shares Soviet (Russian) views or sympathizes with Russian culture, then the broad representation of Ukrainian culture will remain "sharovarshchyna".

Historian Daryna Mishchenko writes that sharovarshchyna appeared largely because of the desire of Ukrainians after Ukraine's independence to have a distinct popular image of their own culture. "There was a thirst to have our own, native, folk culture again. But no one wanted to delve into this history [...] We just paddled everything that came to hand.".

Music critic Katria Honcharuk describes the place of sharovarshchyna as follows: it "succeeds with its task 100 % – it serves as a simple means of distinguishing one's own from foreign for representatives of a particular ethnic group. It's another thing if the image of a nation is vulgar, primitive, and obscures the deeper meaning of a particular culture.".

Music producer Yurko Zeleny commented on the phenomenon of sharovarshchyna as a mutual replacement of different layers of culture: "the level of low cabaret was elevated to the rank of high art. Hence we have blatnyak and the likes of Serdyuchka. All this has been imposed for 25 years. Pop culture sharovarshchyna, like the Soviet one, continues to create the image that Ukrainian culture is inferior, low-grade."
