= Scytho-Siberian art =

Art of the Scythians

Scythian art

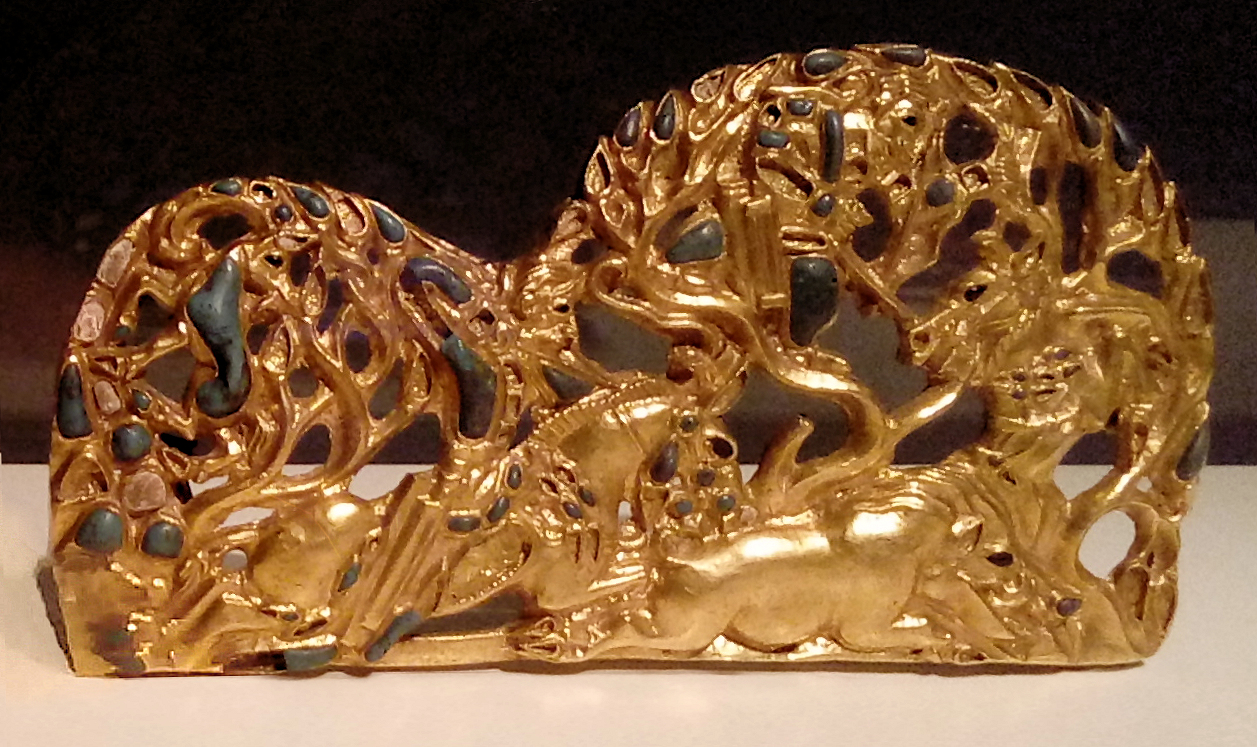
Scythian belt plaque featuring a horseman hunting a wild boar, with characteristic Xiongnu horse trappings, from Southern Siberia, Russia 280-180 BCE. Hermitage Museum.

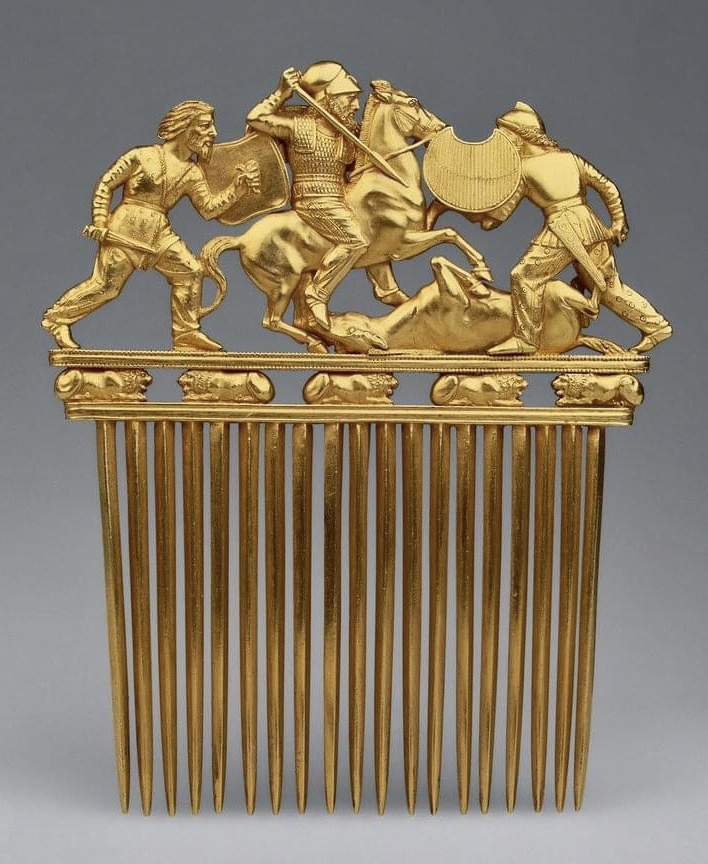
Scythian golden comb, made by Greeks probably to Scythian taste, from Solokha, near Kamenka-Dneprovskaya, Zaporozhye Oblast, Ukraine, early 4th century BCE, Hermitage Museum

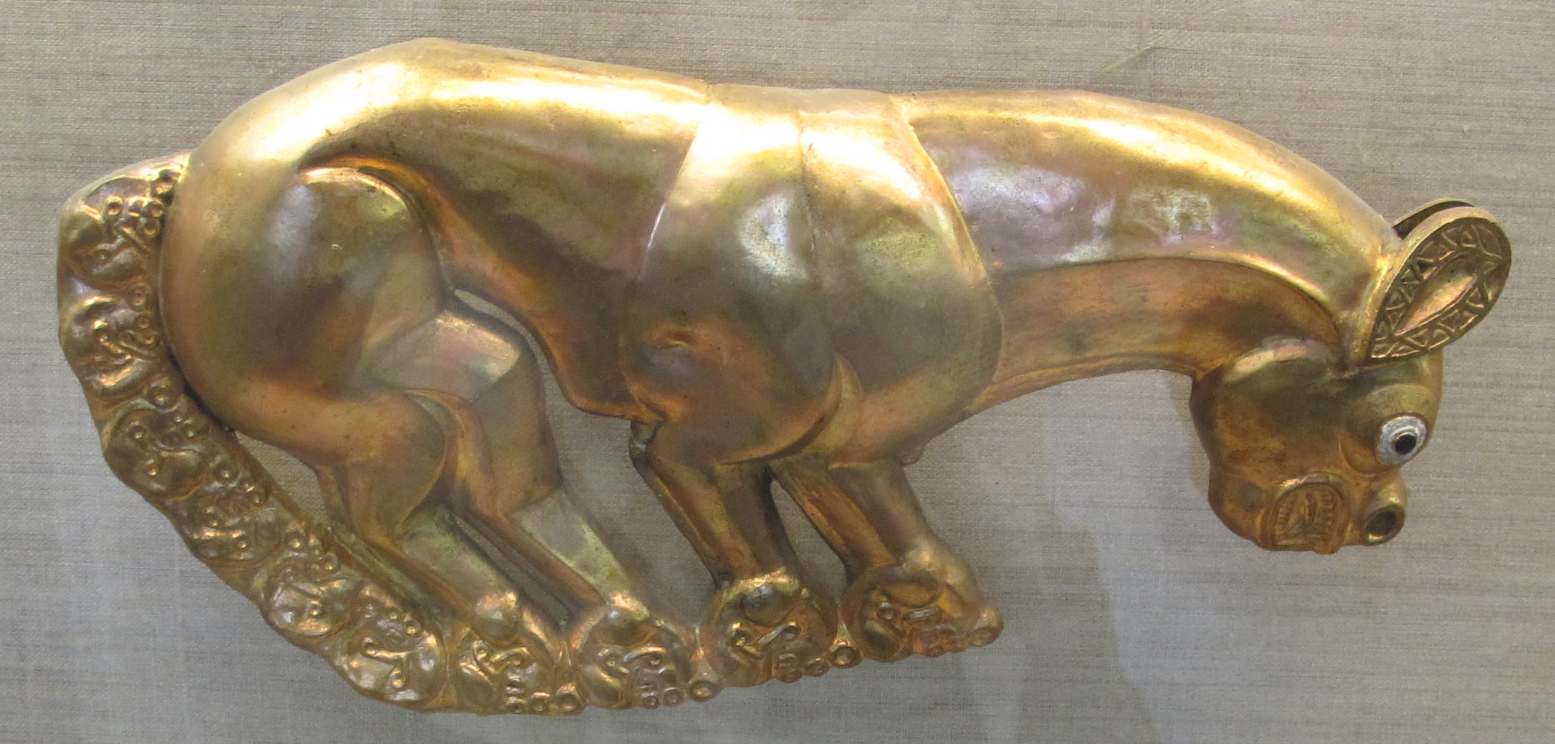
Scythian golden plaque in the form of a panther, from the Kelermes burial mounds in Adygea, Russia, probably for a shield or breast-plate, 13 in/33 cm long, end 7th-century BC.

Scytho-Siberian art is the art associated with the cultures of the Scytho-Siberian world, primarily consisting of decorative objects such as jewellery, produced by the nomadic tribes of the Eurasian Steppe, with the western edges of the region vaguely defined by ancient Greeks. The identities of the nomadic peoples of the steppes is often uncertain, and the term "Scythian" should often be taken loosely; the art of nomads much further east than the core Scythian territory exhibits close similarities as well as differences, and terms such as the "Scytho-Siberian world" are often used. Other Eurasian nomad peoples recognised by ancient writers, notably Herodotus, include the Massagetae, Sarmatians, and Saka, the last a name from Persian sources, while ancient Chinese sources speak of the Xiongnu or Hsiung-nu. Modern archaeologists recognise, among others, the Pazyryk, Tagar, and Aldy-Bel cultures, with the furthest east of all, the later Ordos culture a little west of Beijing. (Note: For more peoples in Herodotus see here) The art of these peoples is collectively known as steppes art.

In the case of the Scythians the characteristic art was produced in a period from the 7th to 3rd centuries BC, after which the Scythians were gradually displaced from most of their territory by the Sarmatians, and rich grave deposits cease among the remaining Scythian populations on the Black Sea coast. Over this period many Scythians became sedentary, and involved in trade with neighbouring peoples such as the Greeks.

In the earlier period Scythian art included very vigorously modelled stylised animal figures, shown singly or in combat, that had a long-lasting and very wide influence on other Eurasian cultures as far apart as China and the European Celts. As the Scythians came in contact with the Greeks at the Western end of their area, their artwork influenced Greek art, and was influenced by it; also many pieces were made by Greek craftsmen for Scythian customers. Although we know that goldsmith work was an important area of Ancient Greek art, very little has survived from the core of the Greek world, and finds from Scythian burials represent the largest group of pieces we now have. The mixture of the two cultures in terms of the background of the artists, the origin of the forms and styles, and the possible history of the objects, gives rise to complex questions. Many art historians feel that the Greek and Scythian styles were too far apart for works in a hybrid style to be as successful as those firmly in one style or the other. Other influences from urbanized civilizations such as those of Persia and China, and the mountain cultures of the Caucasus, also affected the art of their nomadic neighbours.

Scythian art, especially Scythian gold jewellery, is highly valued by museums; many of the most valuable artefacts are in the Hermitage Museum in St Petersburg. Their Eastern neighbours, the Pazyryk culture in Siberia, produced similar art, although they related to the Chinese in a way comparable to that of the Scythians with the Greek and Iranian cultures. In recent years, archeologists have made valuable finds in various places within the area.

== Types of objects ==
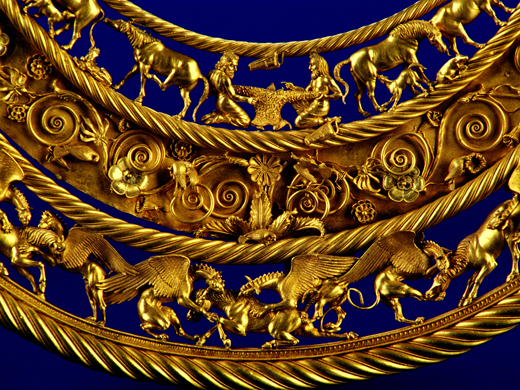
Gold Scythian pectoral, or neckpiece, from a royal kurgan in Tovsta Mohyla, Pokrov, Ukraine, dated to the second half of the 4th century BC.

The Scythians worked in a wide variety of materials such as gold, wood, leather, bone, bronze, iron, silver and electrum. Clothes and horse-trappings were sewn with small plaques in metal and other materials, and larger ones, including some of the most famous, probably decorated shields or wagons. Wool felt was used for highly decorated clothes, tents and horse-trappings, and an important nomad mounted on his horse in his best outfit must have presented a very colourful and exotic sight. As nomads, the Scythians produced entirely portable objects, to decorate their horses, clothes, tents and wagons, with the exception in some areas of kurgan stelae, stone stelae carved somewhat crudely to depict a human figure, which were probably intended as memorials. Bronze-casting of very high quality is the main metal technique used across the Eurasian steppe, but the Scythians are distinguished by their frequent use of gold at many sites, though large hoards of gold objects have also been found further east, as in the hoard of over 20,000 pieces of "Bactrian Gold" in partly nomadic styles from Tillya Tepe in Afghanistan.

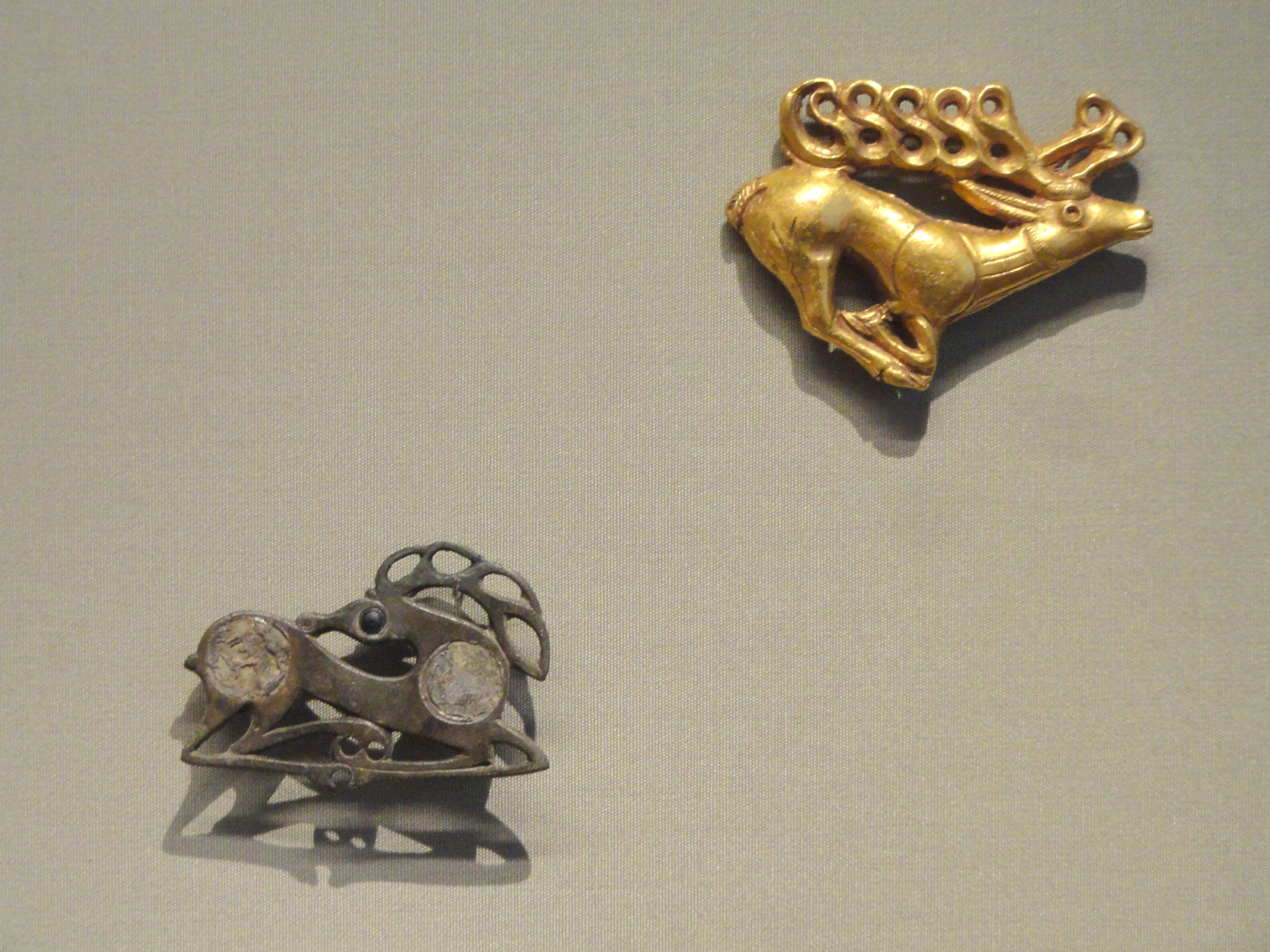
The influence of Scythian art: Fibula in the Form of a Recumbent Stag (below), about 400 AD, Northeastern Europe, and Stag Plaque (above), 400-500 BC, Scythian, western Asia, gold

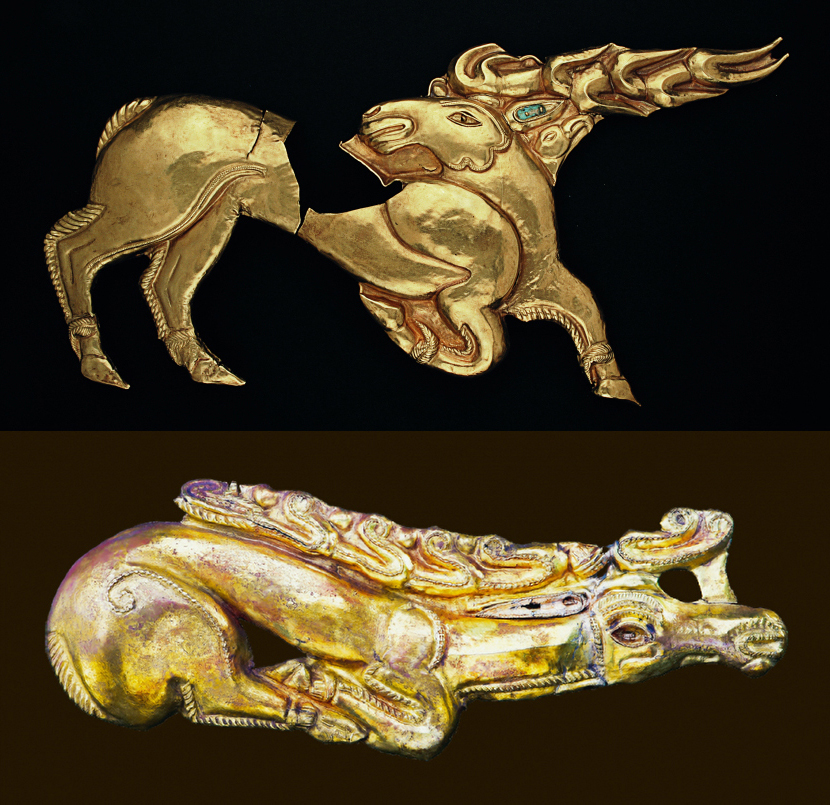
Scythian golden deer shield ornaments from the Iron Age 6th century BC found in Hungary. Above, the Golden Deer of Zöldhalompuszta is 37 cm, making it the largest Scythian golden deer known. Below, the Golden Deer of Tapiószentmárton.

Earlier pieces reflected animal style traditions; in the later period many pieces, especially in metal, were produced by Greek craftsmen who had adapted Greek styles to the tastes and subject-matter of the wealthy Scythian market, and probably often worked in Scythian territory. Other pieces are thought to be imports from Greece.

As the Scythians prospered through trade with the Greeks, they settled down and started farming. They also established permanent settlements such as a site in Belsk, Ukraine believed to be the Scythian capital Gelonus with craft workshops and Greek pottery prominent in the ruins. The Pazyryk burials (east of Scythia proper) are especially important because the frozen conditions have preserved a wide variety of objects in perishable materials that have not survived in most ancient burials, on the steppes or elsewhere. These include wood carvings, textiles including clothes and felt appliqué wall hangings, and even elaborate tattoos on the body of the so-called Siberian Ice Maiden. These make it clear that important ancient nomads and their horses, tents, and wagons were very elaborately fitted out in a variety of materials, many brightly coloured. Their iconography includes animals, monsters and anthropomorphic beasts, and probably some deities including a "Great Goddess", as well as energetic geometric motifs. Archaeologists have uncovered felt rugs as well as well-crafted tools and domestic utensils. Clothing uncovered by archaeologists has also been well made many trimmed by embroidery and appliqué designs. Wealthy people wore clothes covered by gold embossed plaques, but small gold pieces are often found in what seem to be relatively ordinary burials. Imported goods include a famous carpet, the oldest to survive, that was probably made in or around Persia.

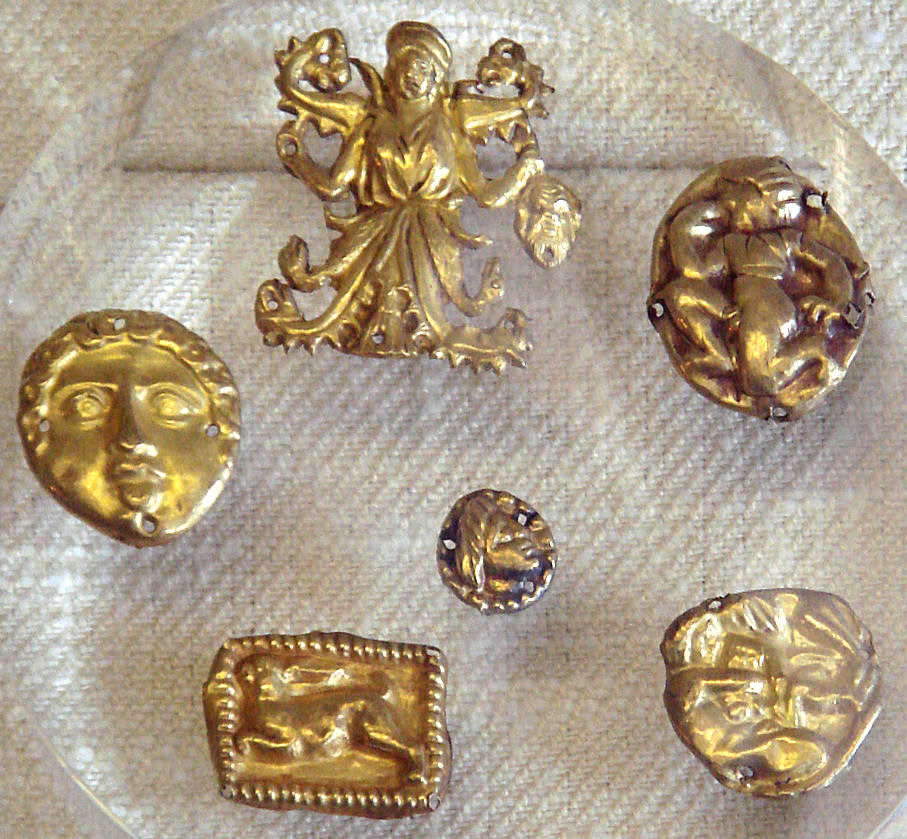
The treasure of Kul-Oba, Crimea, 400 to 350 BC.

Steppes jewellery features various animals including stags, cats, birds, horses, bears, wolves and mythical beasts. The gold figures of stags in a crouching position with legs tucked beneath its body, head upright and muscles tight to give the impression of speed, are particularly impressive. The "looped" antlers of most figures are a distinctive feature, not found in Chinese images of deer. The species represented has seemed to many scholars to be the reindeer, which was not found in the regions inhabited by the steppes peoples at this period. The largest of these were the central ornaments for shields, while others were smaller plaques probably attached to clothing. The stag appears to have had a special significance for the steppes peoples, perhaps as a clan totem. The most notable of these figures include the examples from:

- the burial site of Kostromskaya in the Kuban dating from the 6th century BC (Hermitage)
- Tápiószentmárton in Hungary dating from the 5th century BC, now National Museum of Hungary, Budapest
- Kul Oba in the Crimea dating from the 4th century BC (Hermitage).

Another characteristic form is the openwork plaque including a stylized tree over the scene at one side, of which two examples are illustrated here. Later large Greek-made pieces often include a zone showing Scythian men apparently going about their daily business, in scenes more typical of Greek art than nomad-made pieces. Some scholars have attempted to attach narrative meanings to such scenes, but this remains speculative.

Although gold was widely used by the ruling elite of the various Scythian tribes, the predominant material for the various animal forms was bronze. The bulk of these items were used to decorate horse harness, leather belts & personal clothing. In some cases these bronze animal figures when sewn onto stiff leather jerkins & belts, helped to act as armour.

The use of the animal form went further than just ornament, these seemingly imbuing the owner of the item with similar prowess & powers of the animal which was depicted. Thus the use of these forms extended onto the accoutrements of warfare, be they swords, daggers, scabbards, or axes.

The primary weapon of this horse riding culture was the bow, & a special case had been developed to carry the delicate but very powerful composite bow. This case, "the gorytus", had a separate container on the outside which acted as a quiver, & the whole was often decorated with animal scenes or scenes depicting daily life on the steppes. There was a marked following of Grecian elements after the 4th century BC, when Greek craftsmen were commissioned to decorate many of the daily use articles.

Scythian art has become well known in the West thanks to a series of touring loan exhibitions from Ukrainian and Russian museums, especially in the 1990s and 2000s.

== Groups ==
The earliest Scythian groups and Scythian art and culture are thought to have emerged with the Early Sakas from eastern Eurasia in the early 1st millennium BC.

=== Pontic Scythian art ===
The art of the Scythians proper was part of specific zoomorphic style called the "Animal Style," which was typical of the Eurasian steppe nomads, although the "Animal Style" of the Pontic Scythians was itself an artistic tradition of its own and differed from the variants of the "Animal Style" of the nomads from eastern Eurasia.

The Scythian "Animal Style" represented a limited and specific range of animals in very specific canonical poses, although these did evolve over time. Within the "Animal Style," large surfaces that came together at an angle were used to model the bodies of animals, and the most importants parts of animals were exaggerated and stylised, including:

- the eyes, ears and horns of ungulates;
- the eyes, ears, claws, nostrils, and mouths of beasts of prey;
- the eyes and beaks of birds of prey.

As part of the Scythian "Animal Style" a specific motif known as "zoomorphic transformations" was used, whereby parts of the animals were themselves depicted as animals or parts of animals, such as, for example, the branches of deer's antlers and claws of beasts of prey, which were depicted as the heads of birds of prey with curved beaks.

Some parts of animals, such as legs, hooves, and birds' heads, were often depicted separately.

==== Development ====
===== Early Central Asian period =====
The populations of the Srubnaya and Andronovo cultures from whom the Scythians were descended used solely geometric patterns on their pottery and cheek-pieces made of bone.

===== East Asian origins =====
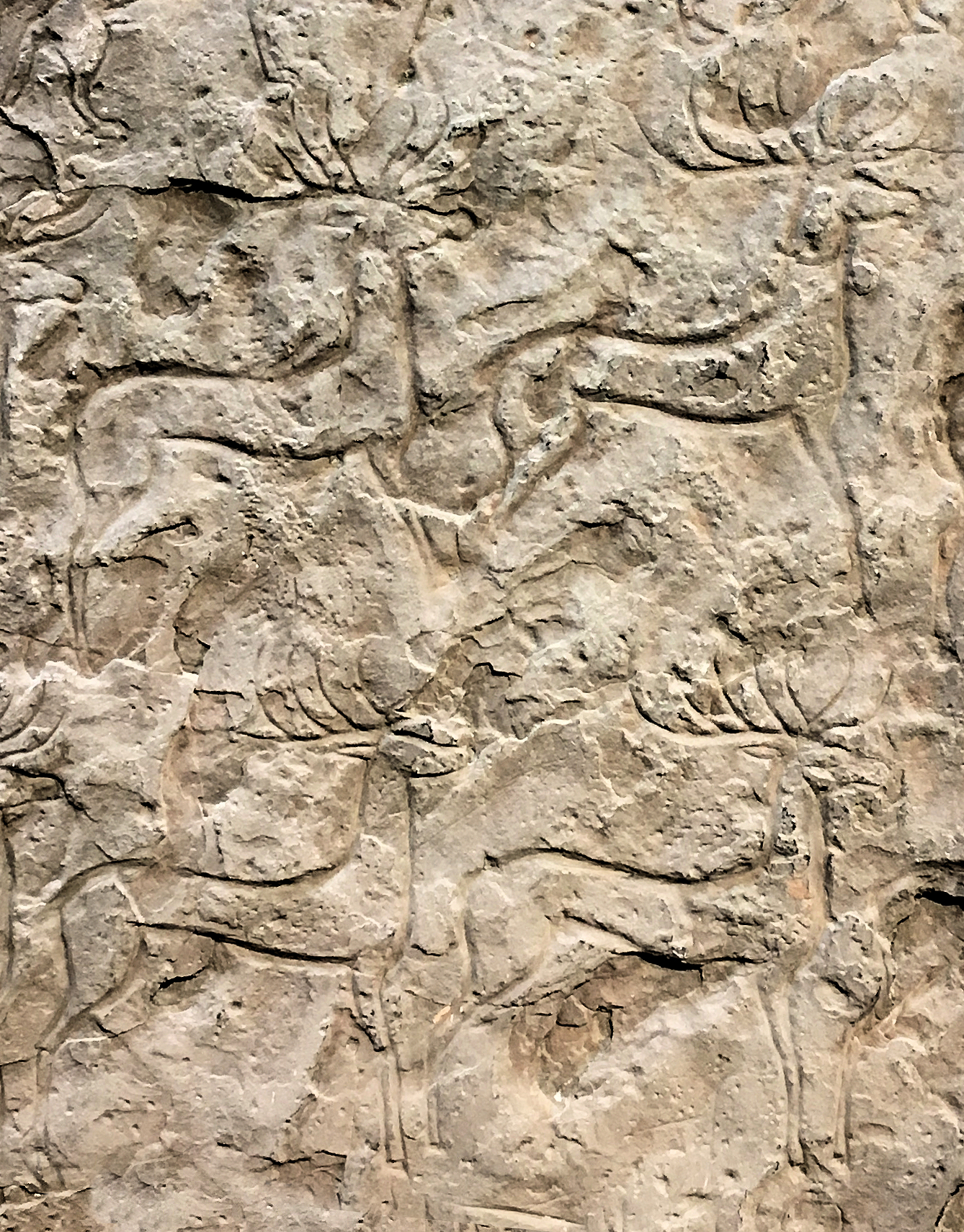
Petroglyphic deers, Okunev culture, Siberia, circa 2000 BCE

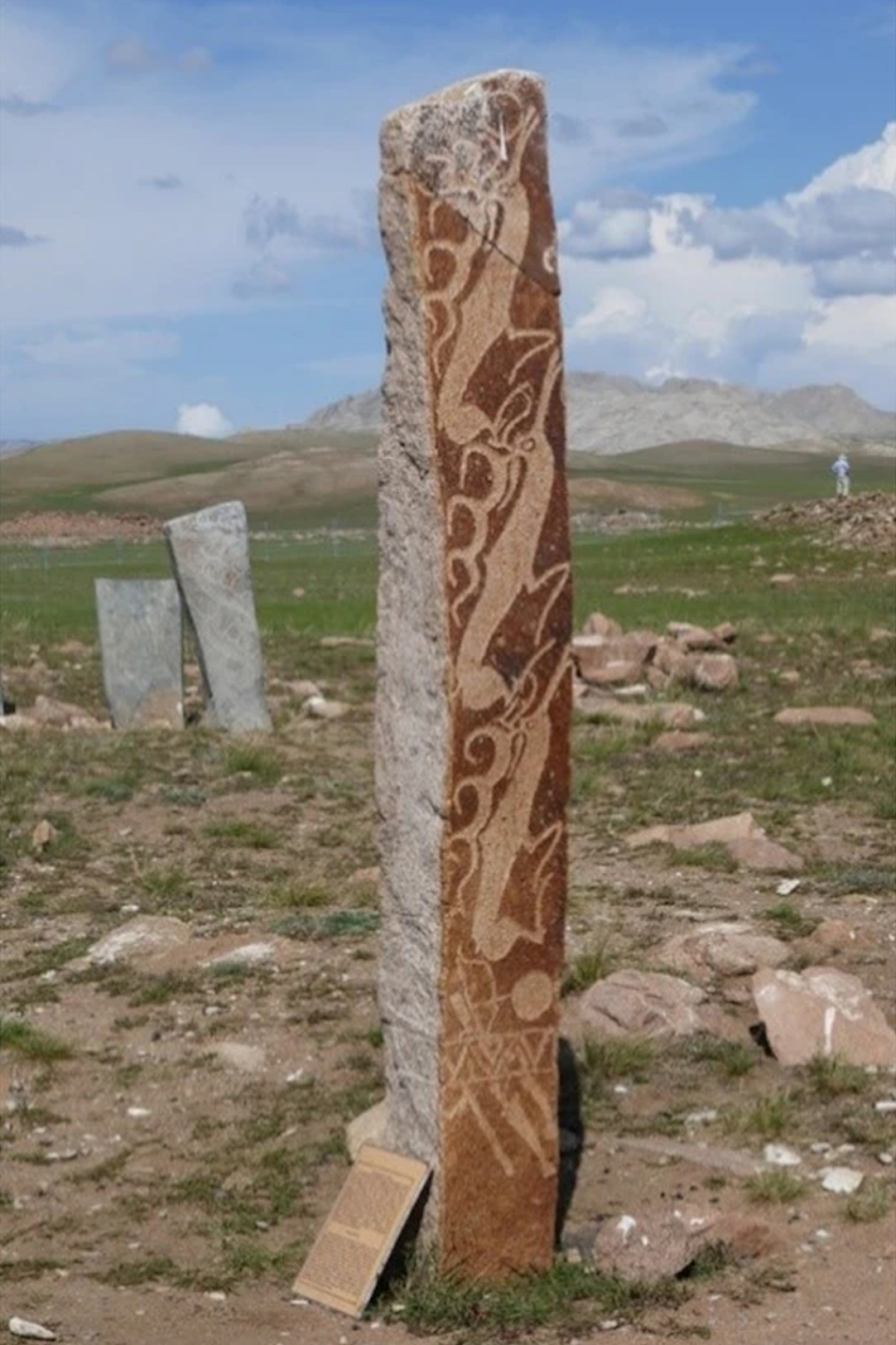
Deer stone, Khovosgol Province, Mongolia, probably c.1400-1000 BCE, often associated to Khövsgöl LBA burials.

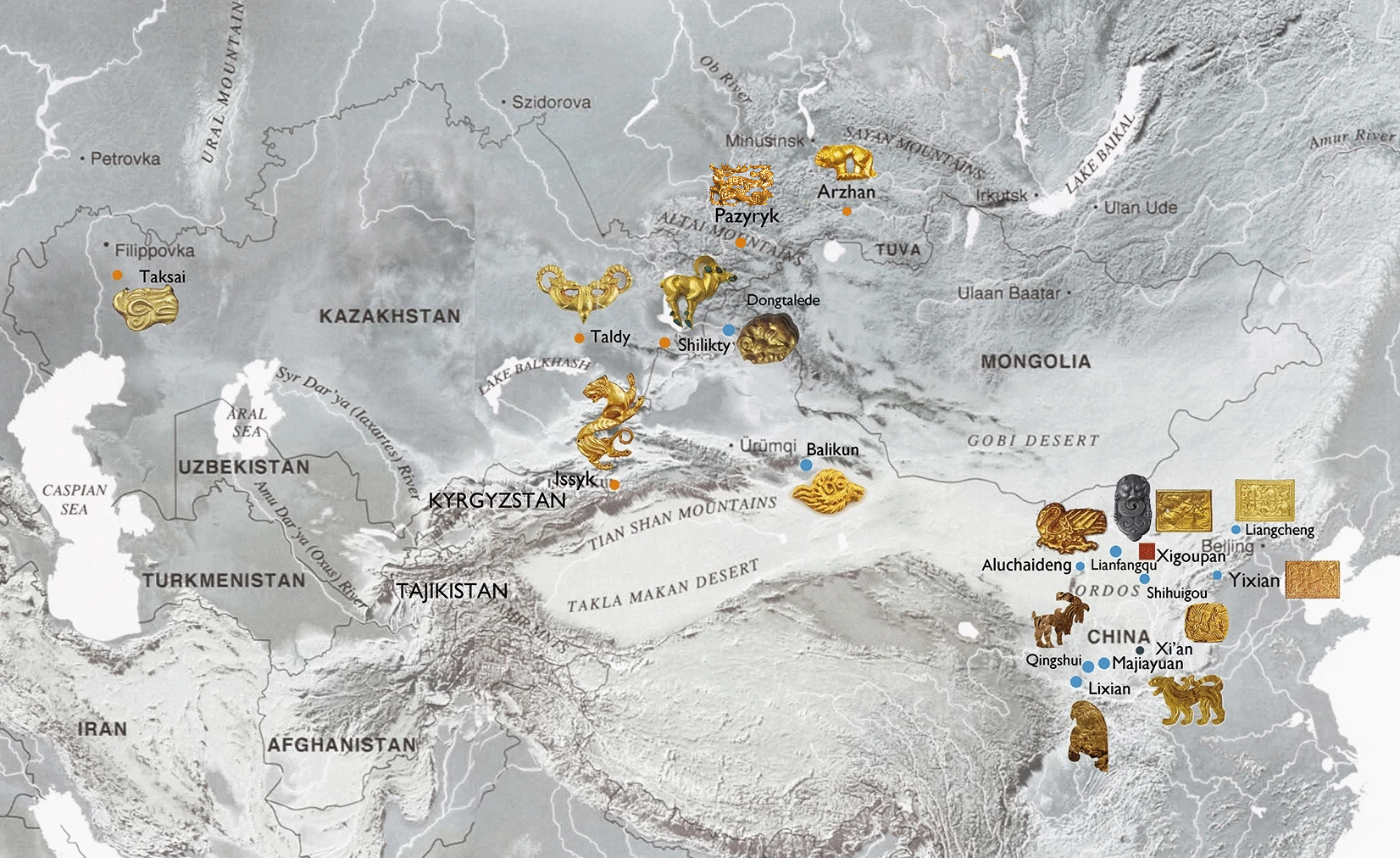
Geographical distribution of early gold and silver artefacts found in Northwest China and Central Asia (8th-3rd century BCE).

The "Animal Style" art of the Scythians was a variant of the art of the Eurasian Steppe nomads, which itself initially developed under the Sakas in the eastern Eurasian steppes of Central Asia and Siberia during the 9th century BC (art of the Arzhan culture, dated to 800 BC), under the partial influence of ancient Chinese art and of the "static" naturalistic art of the inhabitants of the Siberian woodlands, after which it arrived westward into eastern Europe during the 8th century BC. Chinese stylicized standing deer figures of the Shang and Western Zhou dynasties (an example) do precede the deer figures of the Sakas, and artistic and technical exchanges between the two realms are likely, but the Saka interpretation remains rather original and specific to northern Siberian culture.

In return, the new gold-crafting technologies of the Sakas in Central Asia and Southern Siberia were imported by China and influenced the development of gold-crafting technologies there from the 9th century BCE, as seen in the sites of Dongtalede or Xigoupan. According to Duan Qingbo, there is also a possibility that the miniature human and horse shapes of Qin state funeral figurines were inspired by the Art of the steppes, as seen in objects such as the figurines of the Saka incense burners. These technological and artistic exchanges attest to the magnitude of communication networks between China and the Mediterranean, even long before the establishment of the Silk Road.

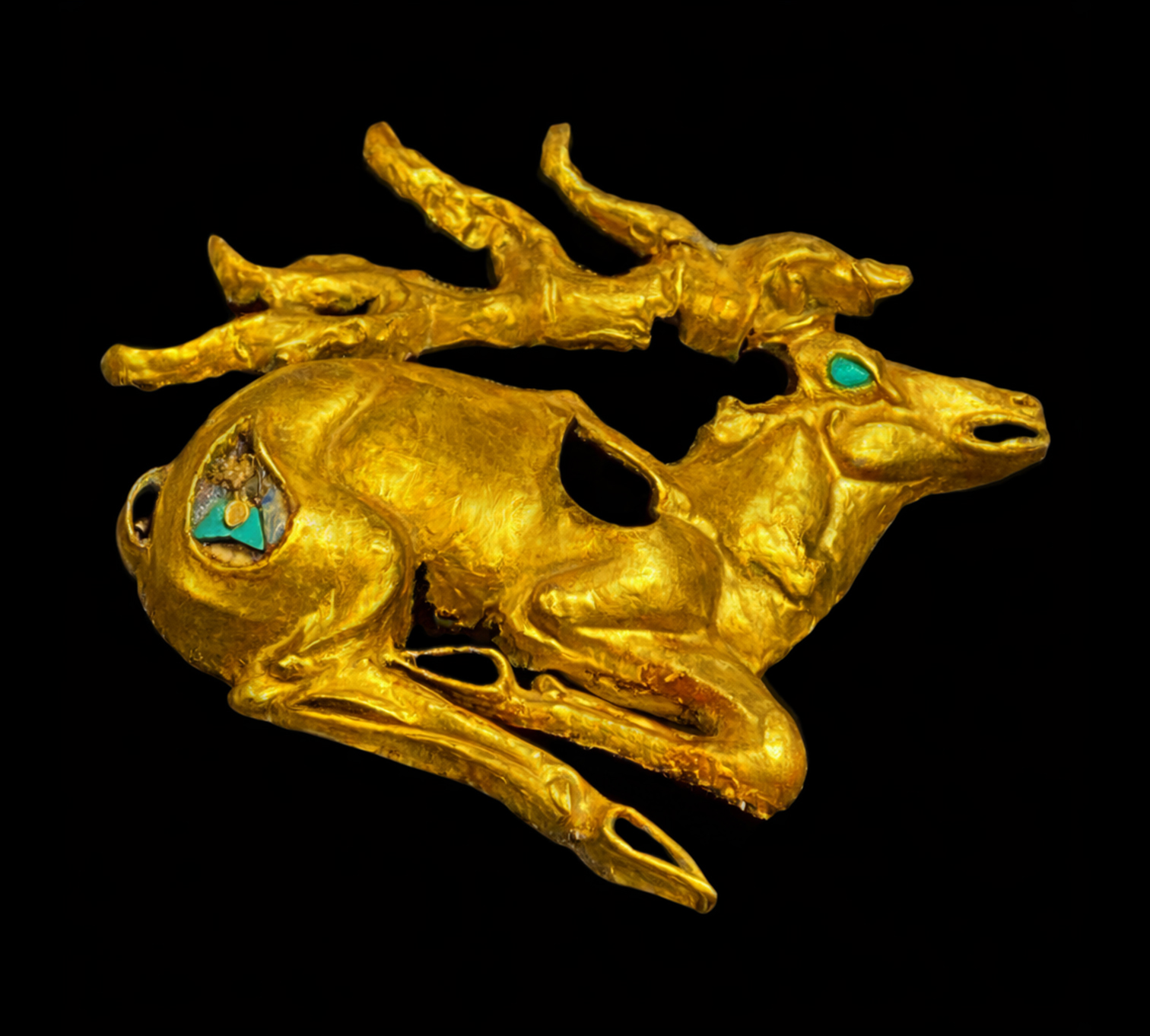
Saka recumbent stag plaque, Eleke Sazy, Kazakhstan; 8th to 6th century BC

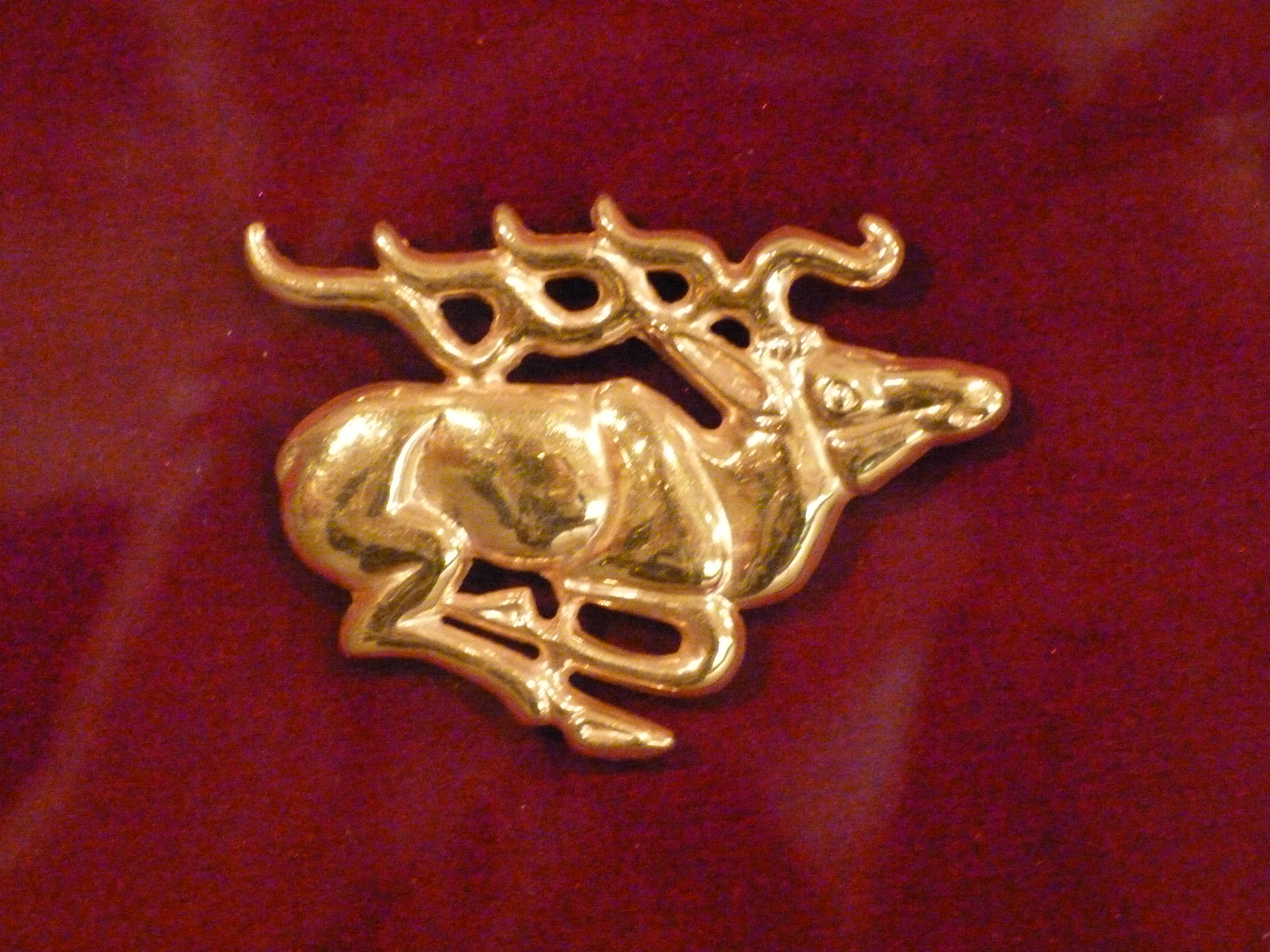
Saka flying deer, Shilikty, 7th to 6th century BC, Kazakhstan.

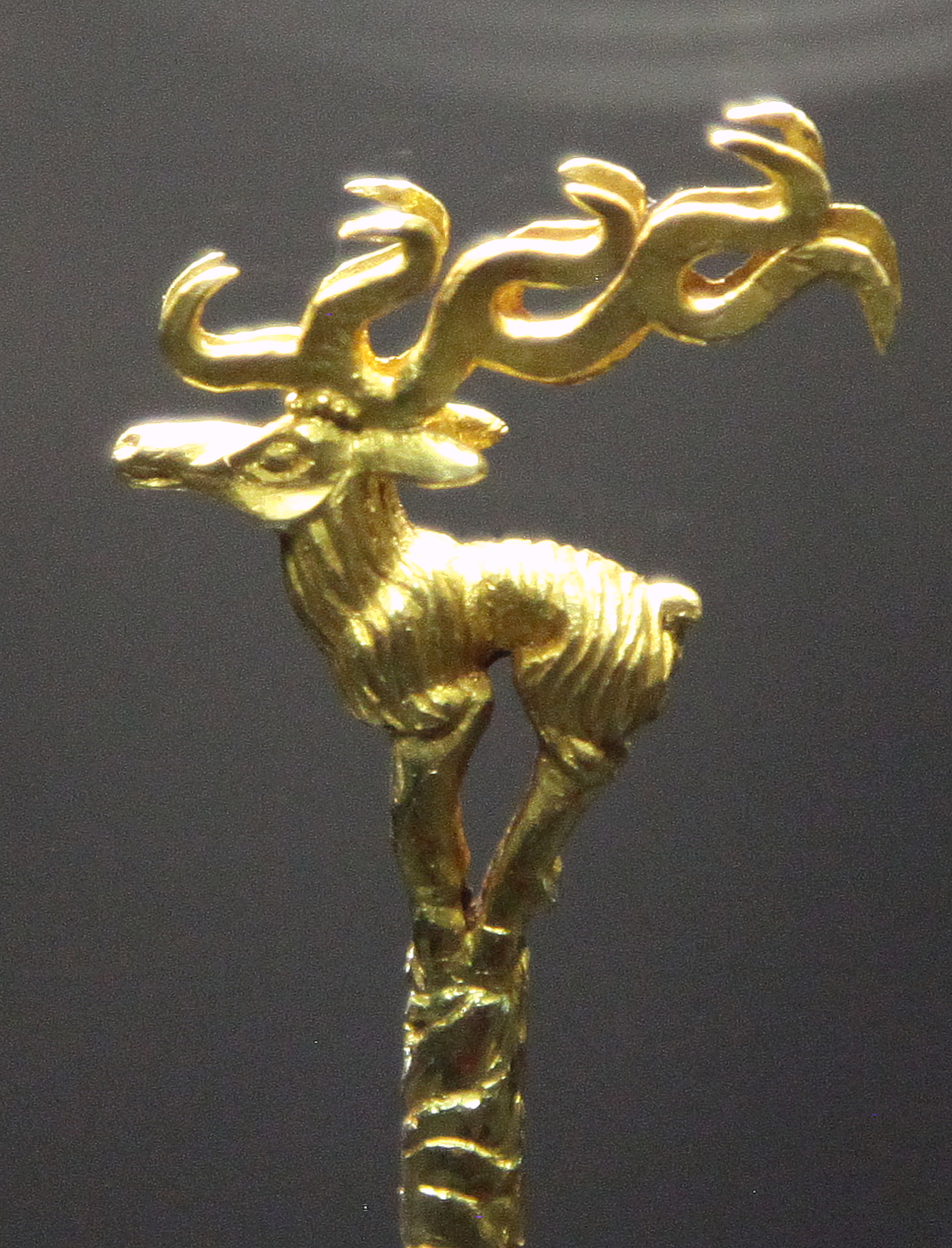
"Animal style" deer, 7-6th century BC, Arzhan, Tuva.

===== West Asian influences =====
During the Scythian stay in West Asia, and especially during their occupation of Media, the Scythian upper class came under the influence of West Asian culture, as a consequence of which the art of the Scythians absorbed many West Asian motifs and themes, due to which the "Animal Style" art was influenced by West Asian artistic traditions The art style characteristic to the Scythians proper thus developed under these conditions during the period between 650 and 600 BC.

In the earlier phases of the art of the Scythians proper, West Asian motifs dominated the earlier Srubnaya-inherited Scythian elements, with this West Asian influence being reflected in the contents of the Melgunov Kurgan and Kelermes kurgans, within which were both Scythian and West Asian artifacts, such as bowls and diadems obtained as booty or as diplomatic gifts, as well as items combining Scythian and West Asian elements, such as swords and axes that were typically Scythian in shape but not in their decorative motifs and artistic styles, although they still reproduced images of the Scythian "Animal Style" art, thus suggesting that they had been commissioned from West Asian craftsmen by Scythian patrons.

Representations of eagle-headed griffins were adopted into Scythian art from West Asian sources at this time, and their depictions appear only at sites where contacts with West Asia are visible, such as the Kelermes kurgan; these representations of griffins became rare in the art of the Scythians after their expulsion from West Asia, and were distorted when they did appear. Particularly common during this period was the image of griffin-rams, that is of eagles with ram horns, which was absent outside of the range of the Scythian culture, and might have represented the fārnā.

Only the items of West Asian origin depicted scenes in this period, and animals were largely depicted isolated or in antithetical compositions. Much of the West Asian imagery was however not absorbed by Scythian art.

Examples of this West Asian-influenced art from the 6th century BC were found in western Ciscaucasian burials, as well as in the Melgunov Kurgan in what is presently Ukraine, and in the Vettersfelde Treasure trove in what is modern-day Poland.

The distinctive style of art characteristic of the Scythians proper thus emerged during their stay in Western Asia during the 7th century BC, and was elaborated primarily to serve the needs of the Scythian aristocracy, hence why it depicted prestigious themes, such as the deification of royal power, and the cults of ancestral heroes and of military valour.

The "Animal Style" style was initially restricted to the Scythian upper classes, and the Scythian lower classes in both West Asia and the Pontic Steppe had not yet adopted it, with the latter group's bone cheek-pieces and bronze buckles being plain and without decorations, while the Pontic groups were still using Srubnaya- and Andronovo-type geometric patterns.

The Scythian stelae representing armed warriors that were erected over burial mounds, known as kurgan stelae, at this time were sculpted so as to depict faces with almond-shaped eyes, moustaches but not beards, arms, and sometimes phalli; the figures on these sculptures usually wear torcs and belts and sometimes helmets, as well as weapons such as swords, axes, gōrytoi, and more rarely whips.

A group of sculptures similar to these were found in Iraq, and might have been erected by a splinter group of Scythians or Cimmerians who had settled there and become acculturated: unlike the typical Scythian stelae, these sculptures represented beards but not moustaches, and only one figure is holding a weapon, namely an axe which is in the figure's hand instead of hanging from his belt.

===== European influences =====
Beginning in the 5th century BC, the influence of arriving Sauromatians from the east, the borrowing of elements from Thracian art as well as the incorporation of Greek elements into the complex synthesis which constituted Scythian art after it came under Greek influence, led to an evolution of the "Animal Style":

- the compositions became less schematic, and the eyes and ears and mouths of animals becoming portrayed more realistically while their bodies started to be modelled more smoothly
- exaggerated representations of certain animal body parts nevertheless became more prevalent in Scythian art during this period, as did stylisation, with bird beaks being depicted as large spirals;
- the technique of "zoomorphic transformations" also became more common, as did the depictions of the single legs of ungulates or carnivorous animals;
- depictions of fish became more widespread, and so did representations of elk in the forest steppe.

In the forest steppe, the art of the Scythian peoples was influenced that of the inhabitants of the eastern European forested areas.

This Scythian art formed out of various influences later spread to the west, in the region which corresponds to present Romania, and eventually it brought influences from Iranic and West Asian art into Celtic art, and also introduced metalwork types which followed Shang Chinese models, such as "cruciform tubes" used in harnesses, into Western Eurasia, where they were adopted by the Hallstatt culture.

Under the influence of both Greek and Achaemenid Persian art, scenes of animals fighting or tearing each other also became prevalent in Scythian art. The appearance of plant motifs in Scythian was also a result of Greek influence.

The kurgan stelae also evolved at this time, with the style of their faces changing, their eyes becoming more rounded, moustaches becoming rarer, and beards starting to appear; the shapes and arrangement of their hands also changed so that they were always holding a rhyton in their left hands, and swords started being depicted on the sides, while the shapes of the gōrytoi changed.

The Greek art further influenced that of the Scythians during the 4th century BC, due to which works of art manufactured by Greek craftsmen for Scythians increased in prevalence in Scythia, although the "Animal Style" art continued to be used. Among these objects were small plaques which followed Greek artistic traditions while depicting elements of the "Animal Style": although these included some images of animals, there was a significantly large number of human depictions, usually of Scythians, but sometimes of Greek themes, such as the story of Achilles.

Depictions of griffins reappeared in Scythian art in the 4th century BC due to Greek influence, and did representations of lion-headed griffins.

Some of the metal works manufactured by Greek craftsmen represented Scythian myths, such as:

- cultic vessels from the Chasti kurhan near Voronezh and the Kul-Oba kurgan, which depict the scene of the contest between the three sons of Targitaos from the Scythian genealogical myth;
- depictions of the Scythian Snake-Legged Goddess, who was the mother of the sons of Targitaos in the genealogical myth, were also very common and have been found at Kul-Oba, Tsymbalova mohyla, and Velyka Blyznytsya;
- the representation of a seated goddess holding a mirror while a man or youth holding a rhyton faces her was found at Kul-Oba, Chortomlyk, Ohuz, Verkhnii Rohachyk, the 1st Mordvynivskiy kurhan, Melitopol kurgan, and the 4th Nosaki kurhan;
- on a plate from Sakhnova bearing the depiction the seated goddess and the male figure with a rhyton is also a scene where two Scythians drink from the same rhyton.

There were also some wholly Greek art items in Scythian burials during this period, such as Greek earrings from the Kul Oba kurgan, and objects made by Greek craftsmen were present in all royal and aristocratic burials from this period, including examples of identical Scythian ceremonial weaponry made using the same matrix from multiple different burial mounds: these had been manufactured at the same time in the same workshop, presumably as commissions by multiple Scythian rulers, or by Bosporan kings to be used as diplomatic gifts for Scythian rulers. Among these objects were gōrytoi depicting the life of Achilles from the Chortomlyk, Melitopol, the 8th Five Brothers Kurgans, and Illintsi kurgans, as well as scabbards from the Chortomlyk and Five Brothers 8 kurgans.

At the same time, anthropomorphic imagery started appearing in Scythian art itself, such as a "Mistress of Animals" from the Oleksandropilskiy kurhan or a gryphonomachy scene on a terminal from Slonivska Blyznytsia. Anthropomorphic depictions were themselves the most conservative form of Scythian art, and most of the sculptures from the 4th century BC were made in the Scythian artistic tradition, although Greek influence was visible in some Scythian sculptures from Crimea, where clothing and armour were represented to an extent that was unusual in Scythian art.

==== End ====
Scythian art extended to the end of the Pontic Scythian kingdom in the early 3rd century BC; the art of the later Scythians of Crimea and Dobruja was completely Hellenised, with the paintings and sculptures from Scythian Neapolis belonging to the Greek artistic tradition and having probably been made by Greek sculptors.

The tradition of erecting kurgan stelae nevertheless still continued in this period, although they were cruder than the earlier stelae and the style of their details did not continue the artistic traditions of the Pontic Scythian kingdom. Some crude reliefs similar to Bosporan ones also decorated tombs from this period.

=== Sarmatian art ===
The Sarmatians, who replaced the Scythians by about the 3rd century BC, also formed a part of the Scytho-Siberian cultural milieu. Sarmatian art preserved the animal style, but with more floral motifs and geometric ornament. Sarmatians produced art — jewelry and plaques — in southern Eurasia from the 3rd century BC to the 1st century AD

Sarmatian artistic habits influenced the Goths, the Germanic tribes of the Migration Period, and subsequent European medieval art.

== Archaeology ==
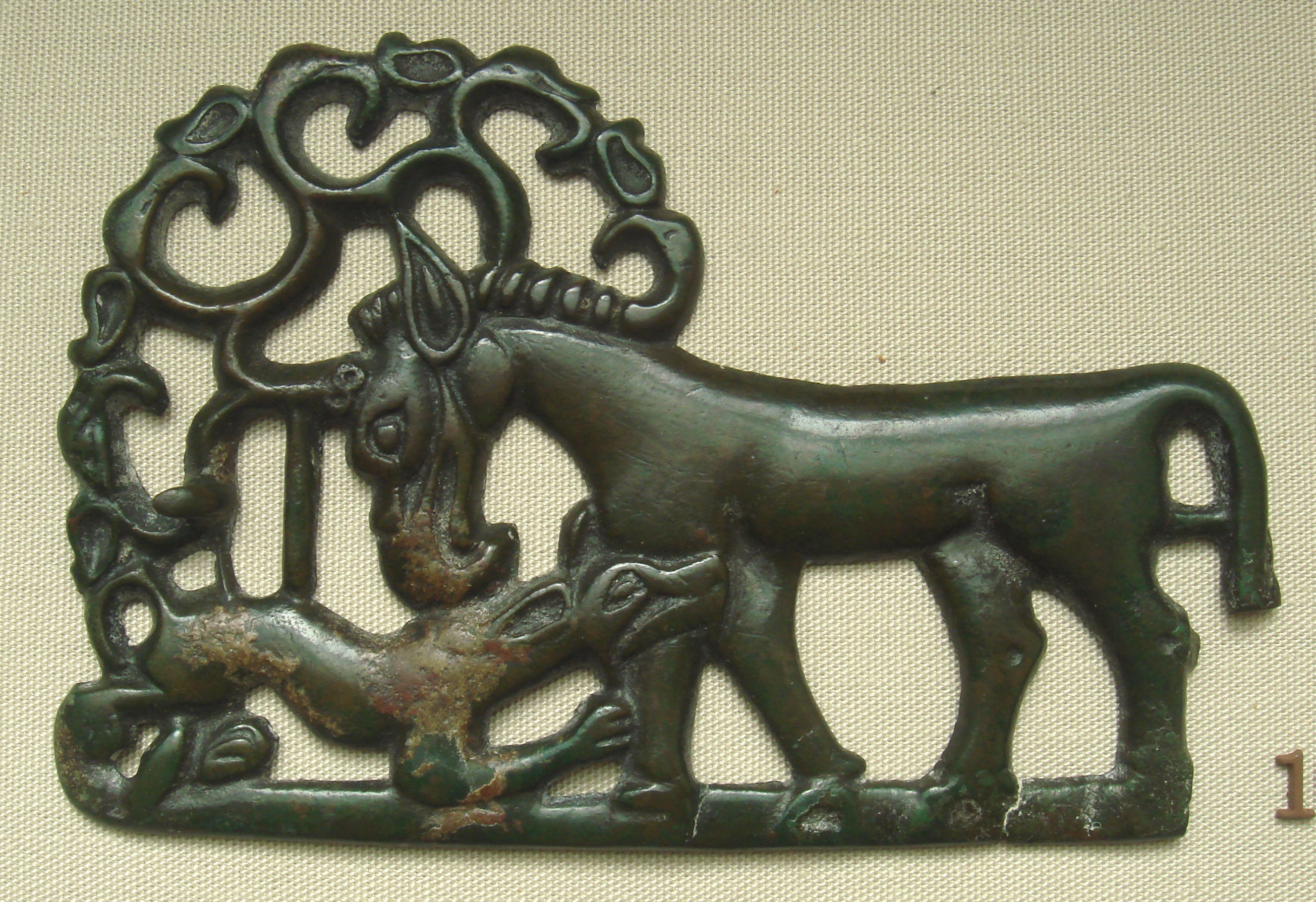
Bronze Ordos culture plaque, 4th century BC; a deer attacked by a wolf

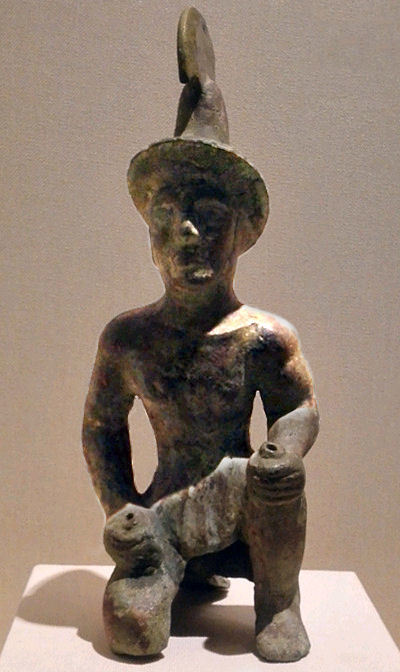
Statuette from the Saka culture in Xinjiang, from a 3rd-century BC burial site north of the Tian Shan, Xinjiang Region Museum, Ürümqi.

Kurgans are large mounds that are obvious in the landscape and a high proportion have been plundered at various times; many may never have had a permanent population nearby to guard them. To counter this, treasures were sometimes deposited in secret chambers below the floor and elsewhere, which have sometimes avoided detection until the arrival of modern archaeologists, and many of the most outstanding finds come from such chambers in kurgans that had already been partly robbed.

Elsewhere the desertification of the steppe has brought once-buried small objects to lie on the surface of the eroded land, and many Ordos bronzes seem to have been found in this way.

Russian explorers first brought Scythian artworks recovered from Scythian burial mounds to Peter the Great in the early 18th century. These works formed the basis of the collection held by the Hermitage Museum in Saint Petersburg. Catherine the Great was so impressed from the material recovered from the kurgans or burial mounds that she ordered a systematic study be made of the works. However, this was well before the development of modern archaeological techniques.

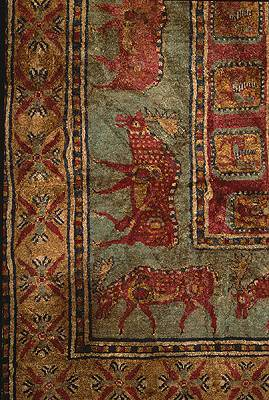
The Pazyryk carpet

Nikolai Veselovsky (1848-1918) was a Russian archaeologist specializing in Central Asia who led many of the most important excavations of kurgans in his day. One of the first sites discovered by modern archaeologists were the kurgans Pazyryk, Ulagan district of the Altay Republic, south of Novosibirsk. The name Pazyryk culture was attached to the finds, five large burial mounds and several smaller ones between 1925 and 1949 opened in 1947 by a Russian archeologist, Sergei Rudenko; Pazyryk is in the Altay Mountains of southern Siberia. The kurgans contained items for use in the afterlife. The famous Pazyryk carpet discovered is the oldest surviving wool pile oriental rug.

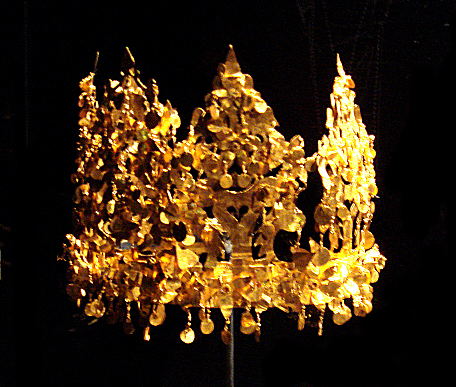
Golden crown. Treasure of Tillia tepe, Afghanistan.

The enormous hoard of "Bactrian gold" discovered at Tillya Tepe in northern Afghanistan in 1978 comes from the fringes of the nomadic world, and the objects reflect the influence of many cultures to the south of the steppes as well as steppes art. The six burials come from the early 1st century AD (a coin of Tiberius is among the finds) and though their cultural context is unfamiliar, it may relate to the Indo-Scythians who had created an empire in north India.

Recent digs in Belsk, Ukraine uncovered a vast city believed to be the Scythian capital Gelonus described by Herodotus. Numerous craft workshops and works of pottery have been found. A kurgan or burial mound near the village of Ryzhanovka in Ukraine, 75 mi (121 km) south of Kyiv, found in the 1990s has revealed one of the few unlooted tombs of a Scythian chieftain, who was ruling in the forest-steppe area of the western fringe of Scythian lands. There at a late date in Scythian culture (c. 250 - 225 BC), a recently nomadic aristocratic class was gradually adopting the agricultural life-style of their subjects. Many items of jewellery were also found in the kurgan.

A discovery made by Russian and German archaeologists in 2001 near Kyzyl, the capital of the Russian republic of Tuva in Siberia is the earliest of its kind and predates the influence of Greek civilisation. Archaeologists discovered almost 5,000 decorative gold pieces including earrings, pendants and beads. The pieces contain representations of many local animals from the period including panthers, lions, bears and deer.

Earlier rich kurgan burials always include a male, with or without a female consort, but from the 4th and 3rd centuries there are number of important burials with only a female.

== Museums ==
Golden plaques representing the resurrection of a dead hero (Saka culture, 5th century BC, Hermitage Museum).

The finds from the most important nomad burials remain in the countries where they were found, or at least the capitals of the states in which they were located when found, so that many finds from Ukraine and other countries of the former Soviet Union are in Russia. Western European and American museums have relatively small collections, though there have been exhibitions touring internationally. The Hermitage Museum in St. Petersburg has the longest standing and the best collection of Scythian art. Other museums including several local ones in Russia, in Budapest and Miskolc in Hungary, Kyiv in Ukraine, the National Museum of Afghanistan and elsewhere have important holdings.

The Scythian Gold exhibition came from a number of Ukrainian exhibitions including the Museum of Historical Treasures of Ukraine, the Institute of Archaeology in Kyiv and the State Historical Archaeological Preserve at Pereiaslav. The Melitopol Museum of Local History also has an important collection, excavated from the nearby Melitopol kurgan. This collection, as well as other gold Scythian artefacts, was targeted and stolen by Russian troops during the Russian invasion of Ukraine.

== See also ==
- Scythian metallurgy
- History of jewellery in Ukraine
- Persian-Sassanid art patterns
- Thracian gold
- Thraco-Cimmerian
- Vettersfelde Treasure
