= Eleke Sazy =

Archaeological site in Kazakhstan

- Location of Eleke Sazy, with contemporary cultures in the 6th century BCE
- Geographical range: South Siberia
- Dates: 7-6th centuries BCE
- Major sites: 47.336742°N 82.126114°E
- Preceded by: Karasuk culture
- Followed by: Aldy-Bel culture, Pazyryk culture, Tagar culture

Eleke Sazy is an archaeological site in eastern Kazakhstan with numerous 6th-4th century BCE Early Saka kurgans. In 2020, archaeologists excavated multiple burial mounds in the Eleke Sazy Valley in East Kazakhstan. Here, a large number of gold artifacts were found. These artifacts included golf harness fittings, pendants, chains, appliqués, and more – most of which are in the Animal Style of the Scythian-Saka era dating back to the 5th–4th centuries BCE.

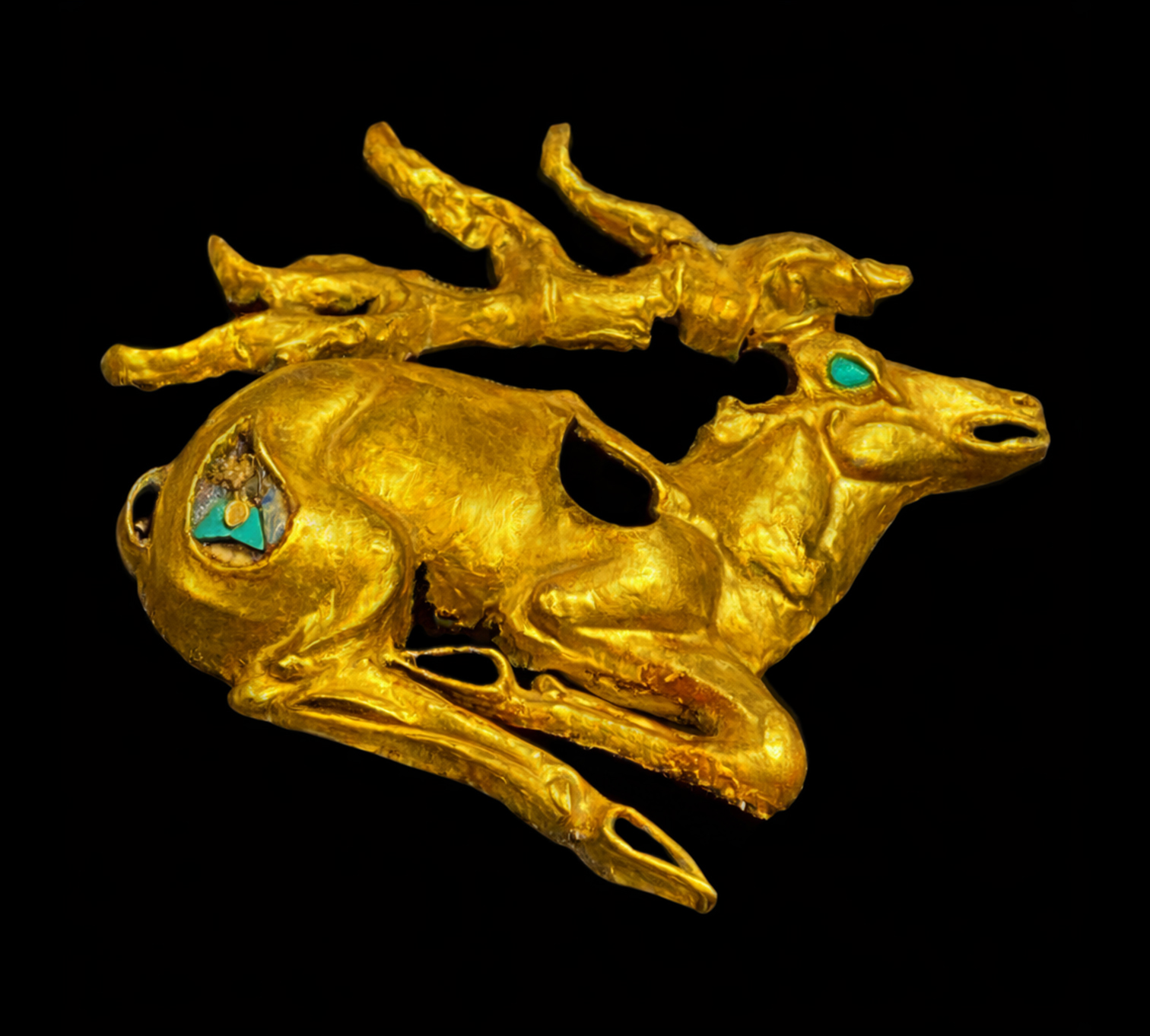
Recumbent stag plaque, Eleke Sazy, Kazakhstan; 8th to 6th century BC

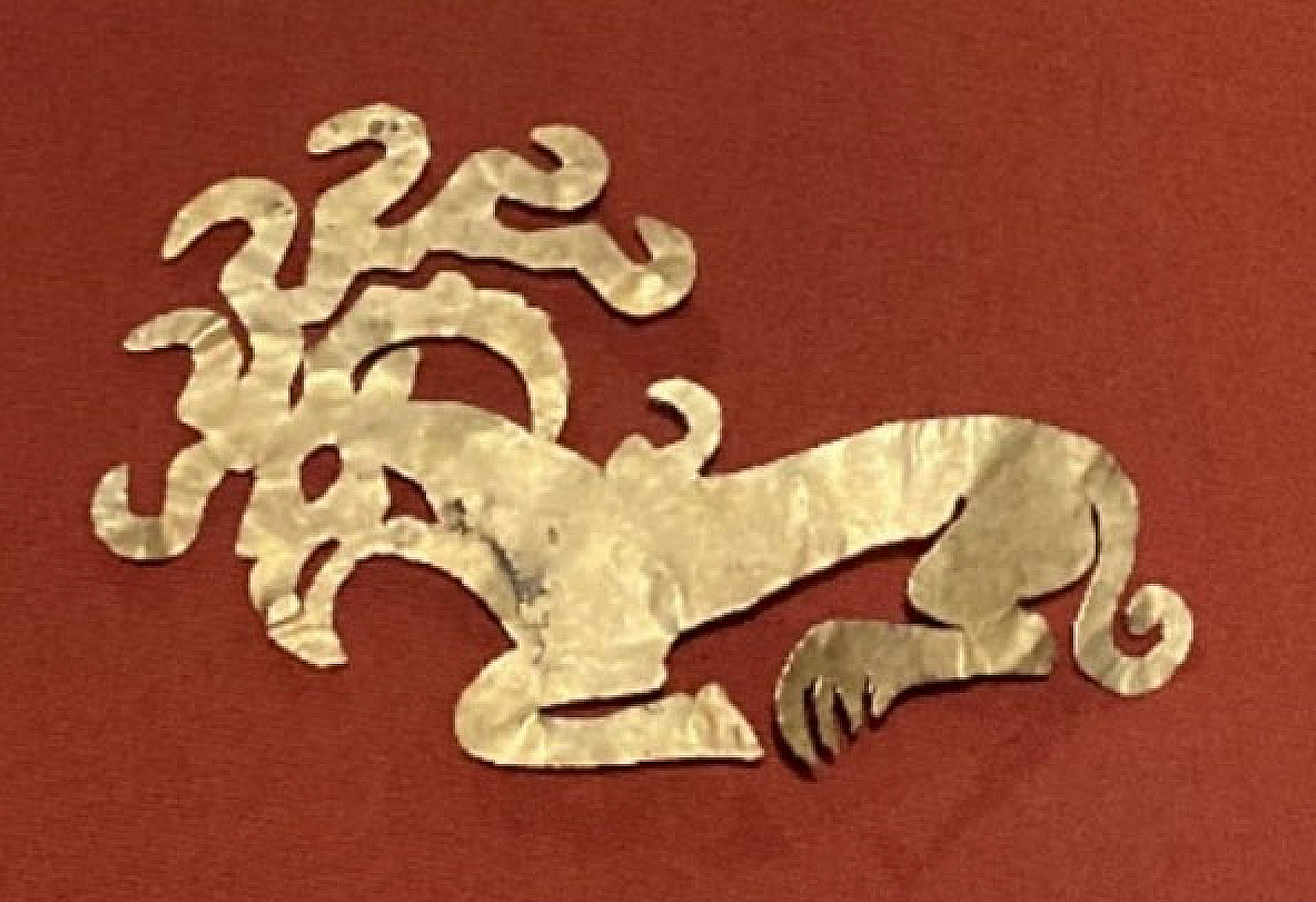
Hippogriff (EKRM inv. no. KПO94-39409-39413); gold; Kurgan 7, Group IV, Eleke Sazy, Tarbagatai mountains, Kazakhstan; 5th to 4th century BC.
