= Animal style =

Iron Age art movement characterized by the use of animal motifs

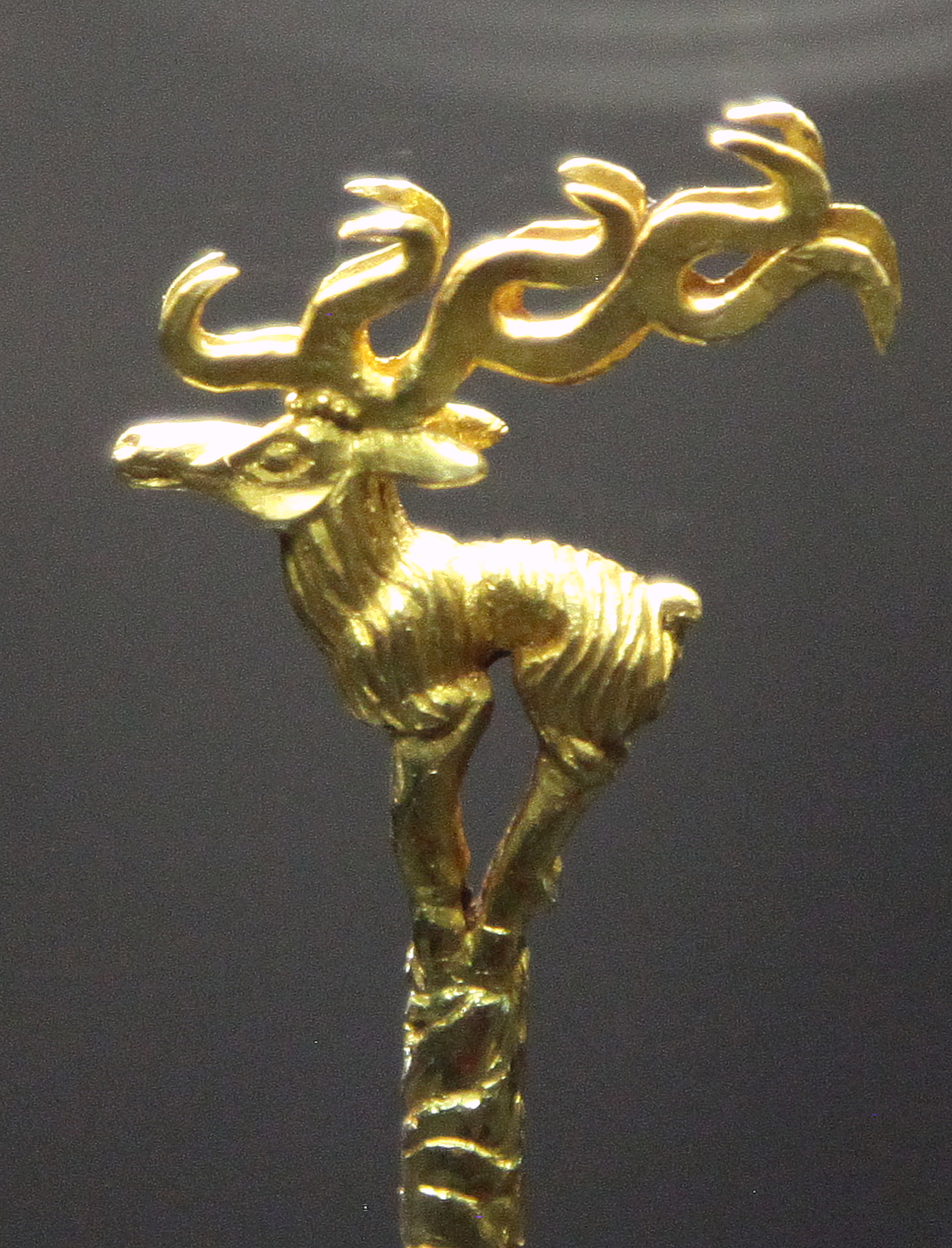
"Animal style" deer, (8-7th century BC) Arzhan kurgan, Tuva.

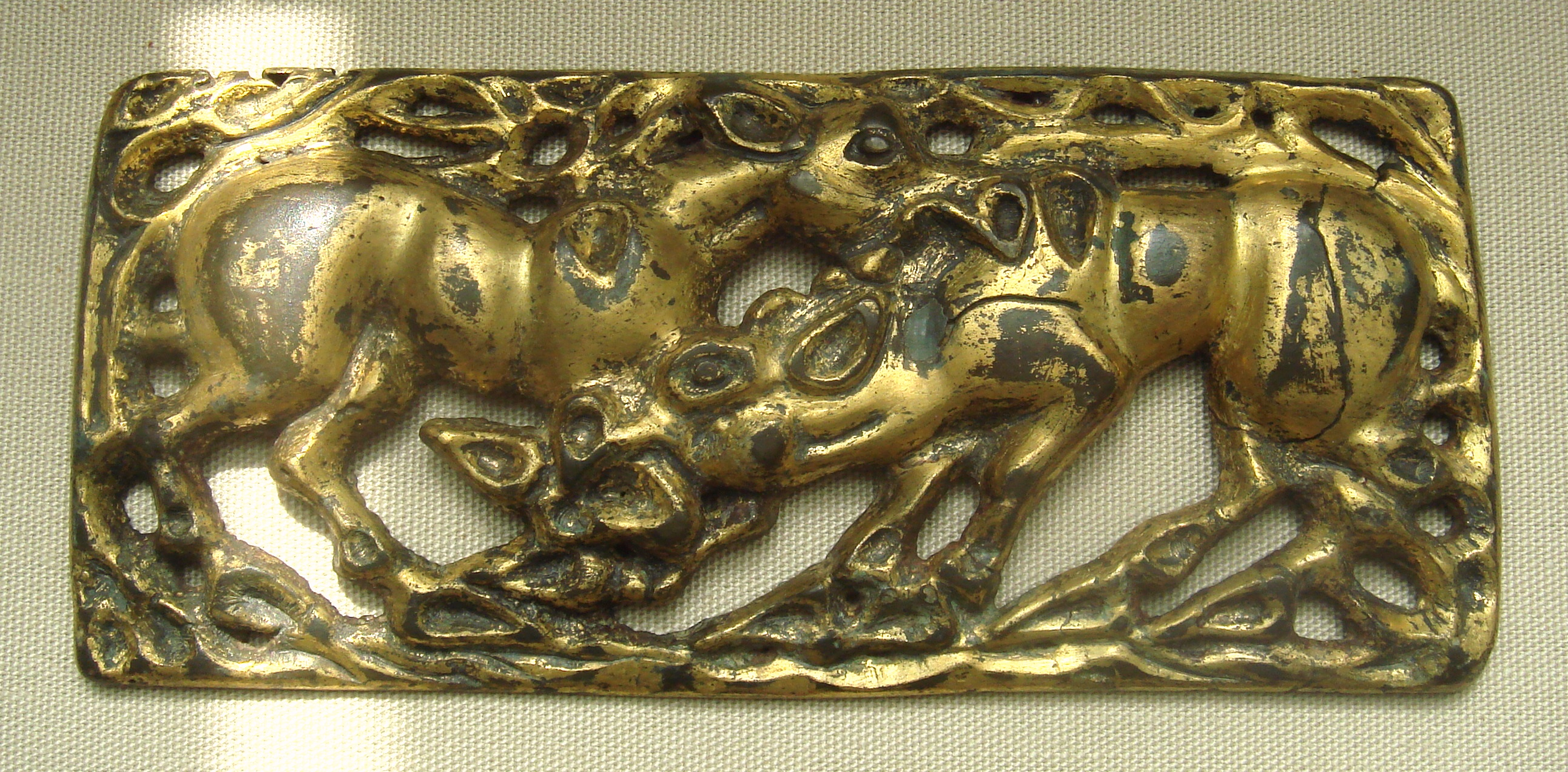
Ordos culture, belt buckle, 3rd–1st century BC

Animal style art is an approach to decoration found from Ordos culture to Northern Europe in the early Iron Age, and the migration period art of the Migration Period, characterized by its emphasis on animal motifs. The zoomorphic style of decoration was used to decorate small objects by warrior-herdsmen, whose economy was based on breeding and herding animals, supplemented by trade and plunder. Animal art is a more general term for all art depicting animals.

== Eastern styles ==
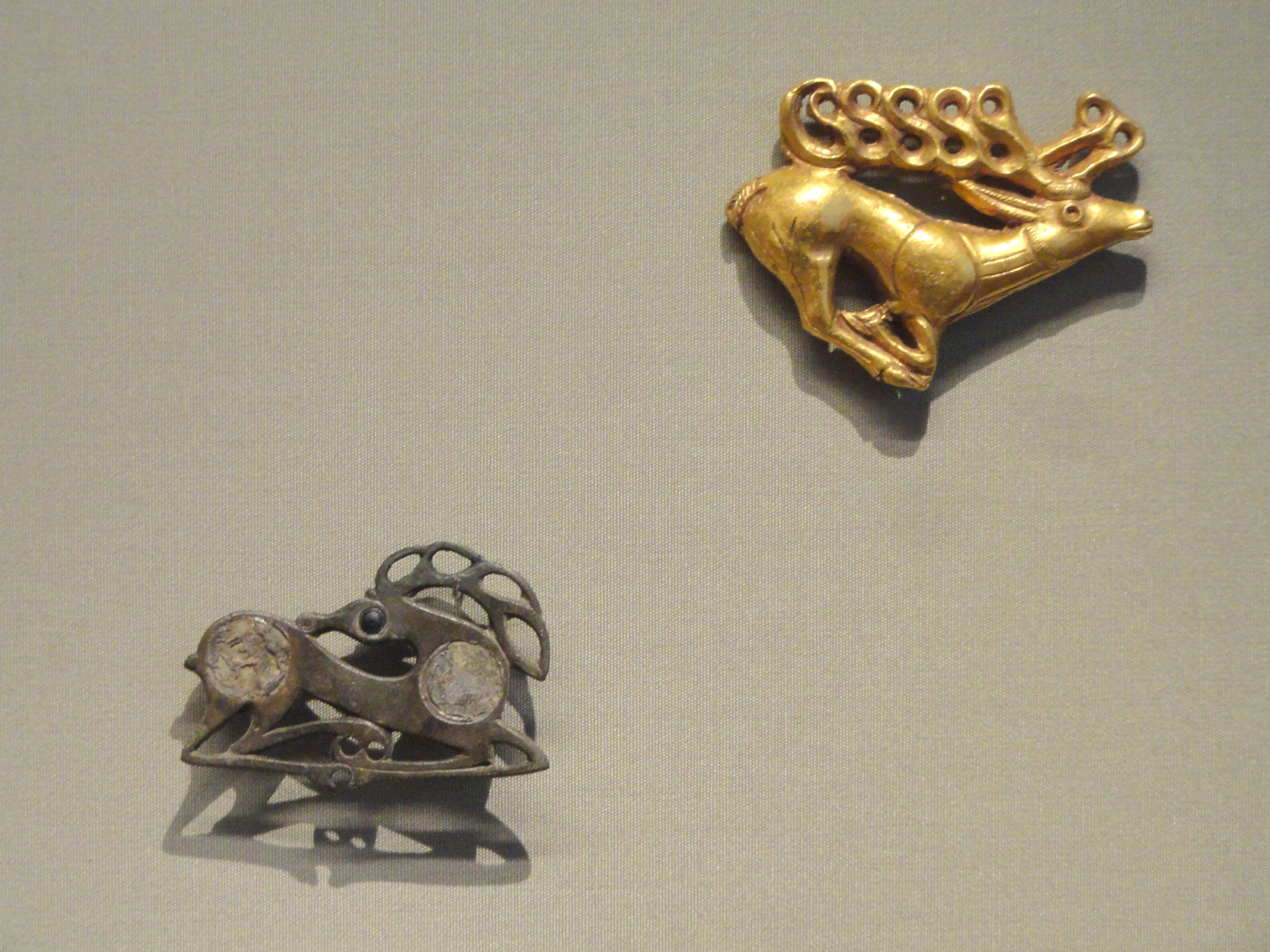
The influence of Scythian art: Fibula in the Form of a Recumbent Stag (below), about 400 AD, Northeastern Europe, and Stag Plaque (above), 400–500 BC, Scythian, western Asia, gold

Scythian art makes great use of animal motifs, one component of the "Scythian triad" of weapons, horse-harness, and Scythian-style wild-animal art. The cultures referred to as Scythian-style included the Cimmerian and Sarmatian cultures in European Sarmatia and stretched across the Eurasian steppe north of the Near East to the Ordos culture of Inner Mongolia. These cultures were extremely influential in spreading many local versions of the style.

Steppe jewellery features various animals, including stags, cats, birds, horses, bears, wolves and mythical beasts. The gold figures of stags in a crouching position with legs tucked beneath the body, head upright and muscles bunched tight to give the impression of speed, are particularly impressive. The "looped" antlers of most figures are a distinctive feature, not found in Chinese images of deer. The species represented has seemed to many scholars to be the reindeer, which was not found in the regions inhabited by the steppe peoples at this period. The largest of these were the central ornaments for shields, while others were smaller plaques probably attached to clothing. The stag appears to have had a special significance for the steppe peoples, perhaps as a clan totem. The most notable of these figures include examples from:

- the Arzhan kurgan, Tuva, Siberia, with animal-style artifacts (8th to 7th century BC).
- the burial site of Kostromskaya in the Kuban, dating from the 6th century BC (Hermitage)
- Tápiószentmárton in Hungary, dating from the 5th century BC, now National Museum of Hungary, Budapest
- Kul Oba in the Crimea, dating from the 4th century BC (Hermitage).

Another characteristic form is the openwork plaque including a stylized tree over the scene at one side, of which two examples are illustrated here. Later large Greek-made pieces (Greek artists interacted with Scythians via Greek colonies on the northern Black Sea coast) often include a zone showing Scythian men apparently going about their daily business, in scenes more typical of Greek art than of nomad-made pieces. Some scholars have attempted to attach narrative meanings to such scenes, but this remains speculative.

Although gold was widely used by the ruling élite of the various Scythian tribes, the predominant material for the various animal forms was bronze. The bulk of these items were used to decorate horse-harness, leather belts and personal clothing. In some cases these bronze animal-figures when sewn onto stiff leather jerkins and belts, helped to act as armour.

Bronze idol of a bear found in the Perm Krai, 6th or 7th century.

The use of the animal form went further than just ornament, these seemingly imbuing the owner of the item with similar prowess and powers of the animal which was depicted. Thus the use of these forms extended onto the accoutrements of warfare, be they swords, daggers, scabbards, or axes.

A distinct Permian style of bronze or copper alloy objects from around the 5th–10th centuries AD are found near the Ural Mountains and the Volga and Kama rivers in present-day Russia.

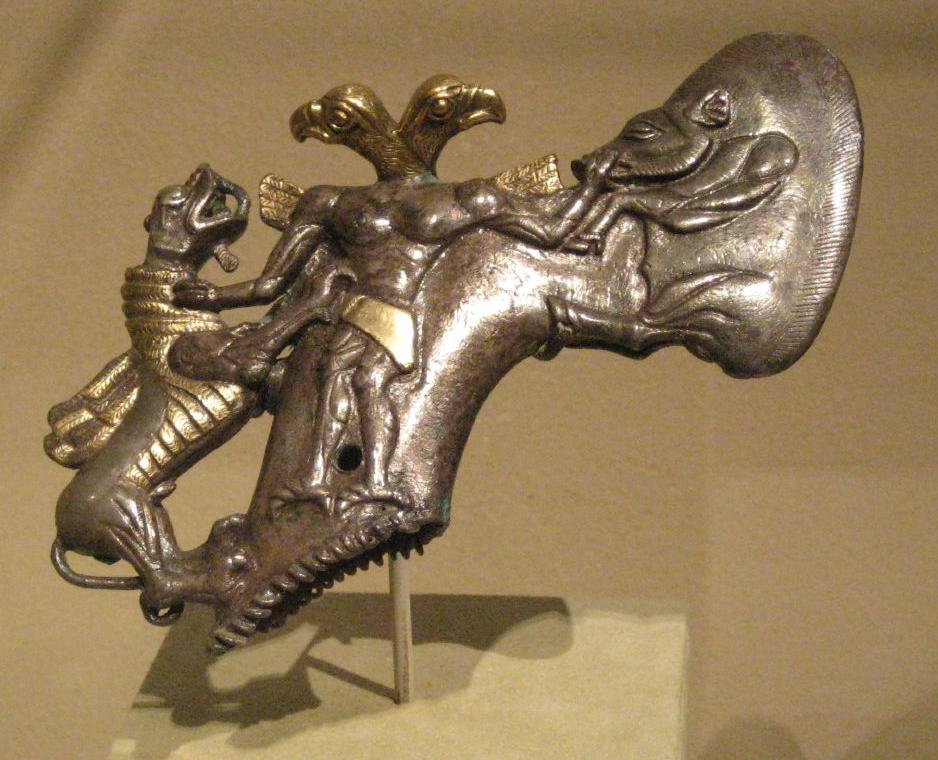
Shaft-hole Axe Head with Bird-Headed Demon, a Boar, and a Dragon figurine. From Central Asia (Bactria-Margiana), late 3rd – early 2nd millennium BC.

== Germanic animal style ==
The study of Germanic zoomorphic decoration was pioneered by Bernhard Salin in a work published in 1904. Salin classified animal art from roughly 400 to 900 AD into three phases. The origins of these different phases remain the subject of debate; developing trends in late-Roman popular provincial art was an element, as were earlier traditions of the nomadic Asiatic steppe peoples. Styles I and II are found widely across Europe in the art of the "barbarian" peoples during the Migration Period.

Style I. First appearing in northwest Europe, first expressed with the introduction of the chip carving technique applied to bronze and silver in the 5th century. It is characterized by animals whose bodies are divided into sections, and typically appear at the fringes of designs whose main emphasis is on abstract patterns.

Style II. After about 560–570 Style I, declining, began to be supplanted. The animals of Style II are whole beasts, their bodies elongated into "ribbons" which intertwined into symmetrical shapes with no pretense of naturalism—rarely with legs—tending to be described as serpents, though heads often have characteristics of other animals. The animals become subsumed into ornamental patterns, typically interlace. Examples of Style II can be found on the gold purse lid (picture) from Sutton Hoo (c. 625). Eventually about 700 localised styles develop, and it is no longer very useful to talk of a general Germanic style.

Salin Style III is found mainly in Scandinavia, and may also be called Viking art. Interlace, where it occurs, becomes less regular and more complex, and if not three-dimensional animals are usually seen in profile but twisted, exaggerated, surreal, with fragmented body parts filling every available space, creating an intense detailed energetic feel. Animals' bodies become hard for the unpractised viewer to read, and there is a very common motif of the "gripping beast" where an animal's mouth grips onto another element of the composition to connect two parts. Animal style was one component, along with Celtic art and late classical elements, in the formation of style of Insular art and Anglo-Saxon art in the British Isles, and through these routes and others on the Continent, left a considerable legacy in later Medieval art.

Other names are sometimes used: in Anglo-Saxon art Kendrick preferred "Helmet" and "Ribbon" for Styles I and II.

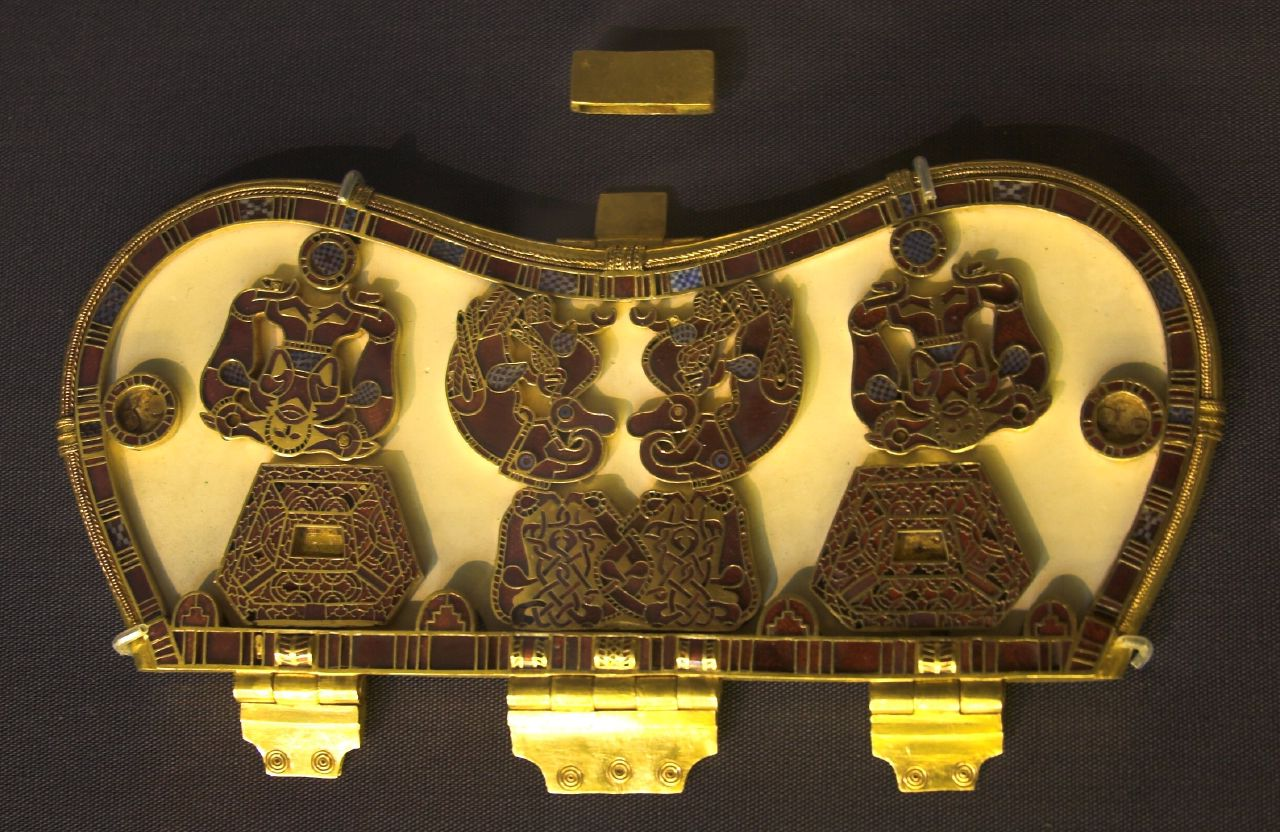
Sutton Hoo purse-lid, 7th century, with Style II animals. British Museum:1939,1010.2.a-l

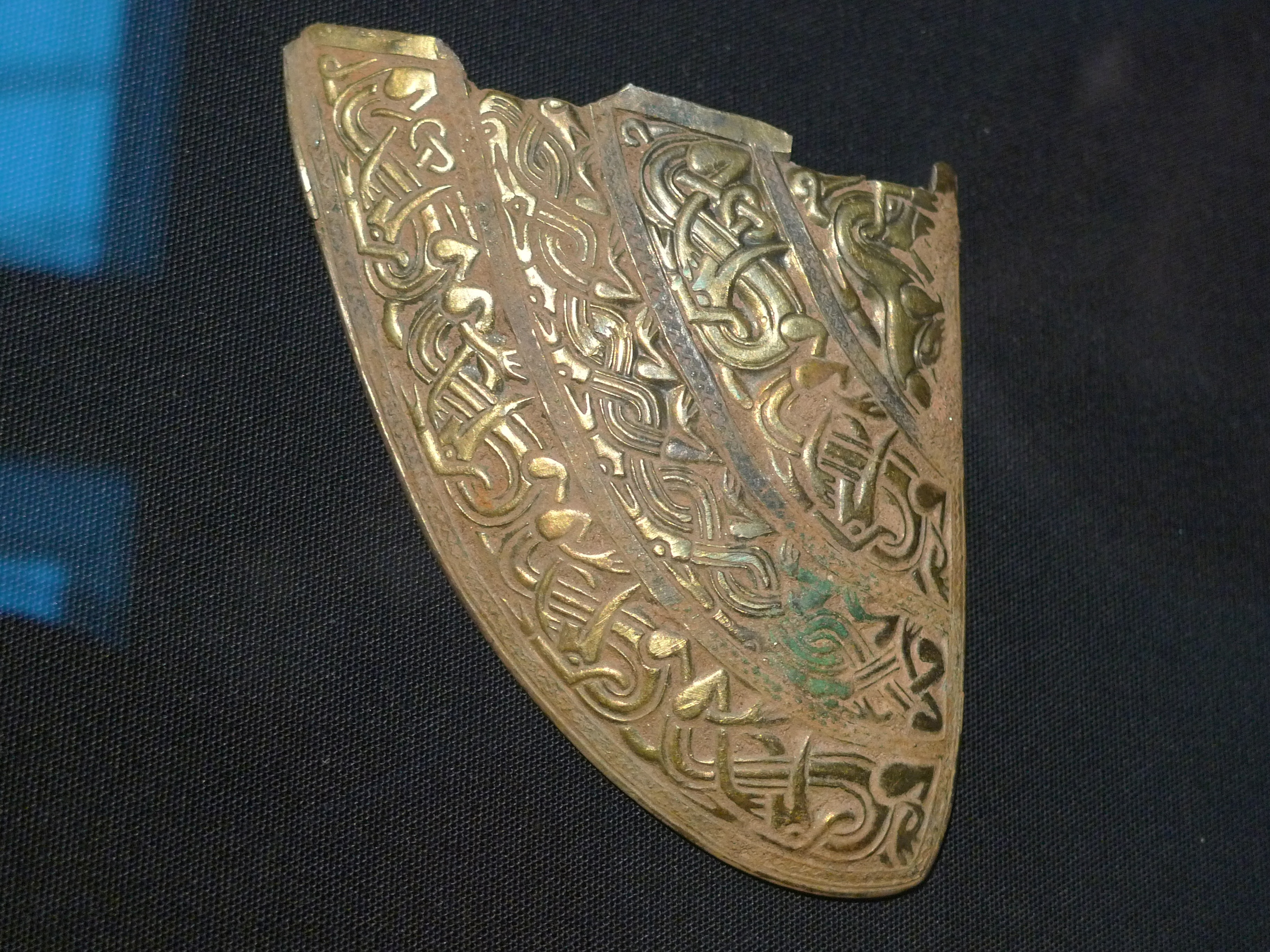
Cheek piece from a helm from the 7th to 8th century Staffordshire Hoard

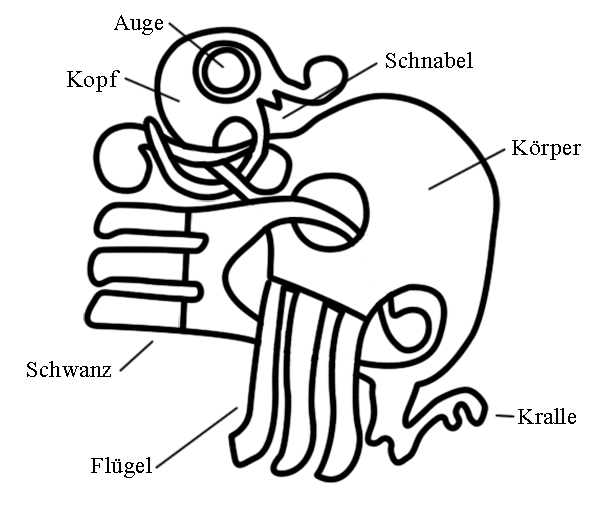
Analysis of a bird from Broa, after whose finds the "Broa" style, a phase of Salin's Style III, is named.

== See also ==
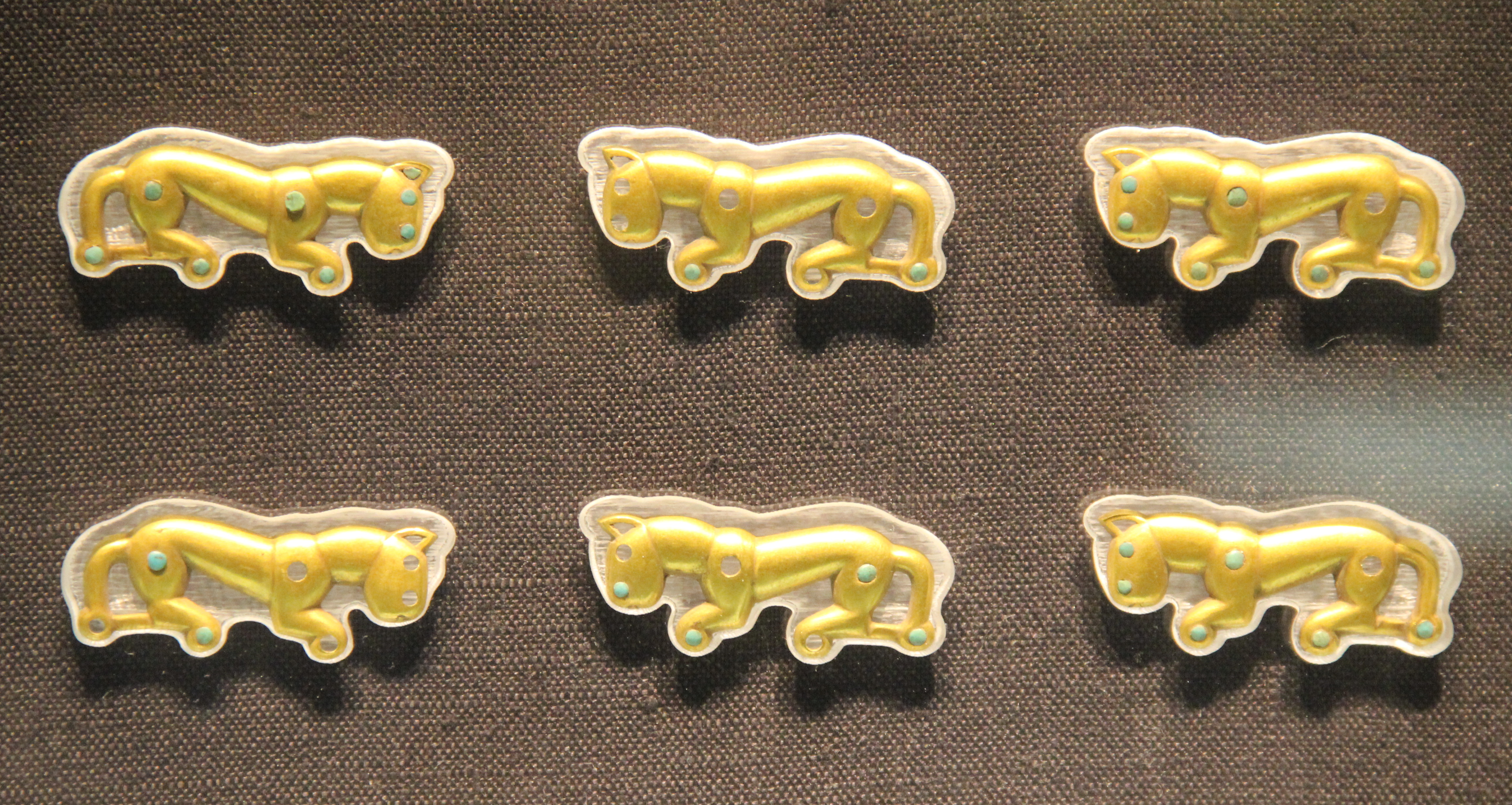
Warring States gold tigers, Hebei Province, China

- Migration Period art
- Thracian art
- Persian-Sassanid art patterns
- Confronted-animals
