= Vettersfelde Treasure =

Hoard found in Poland

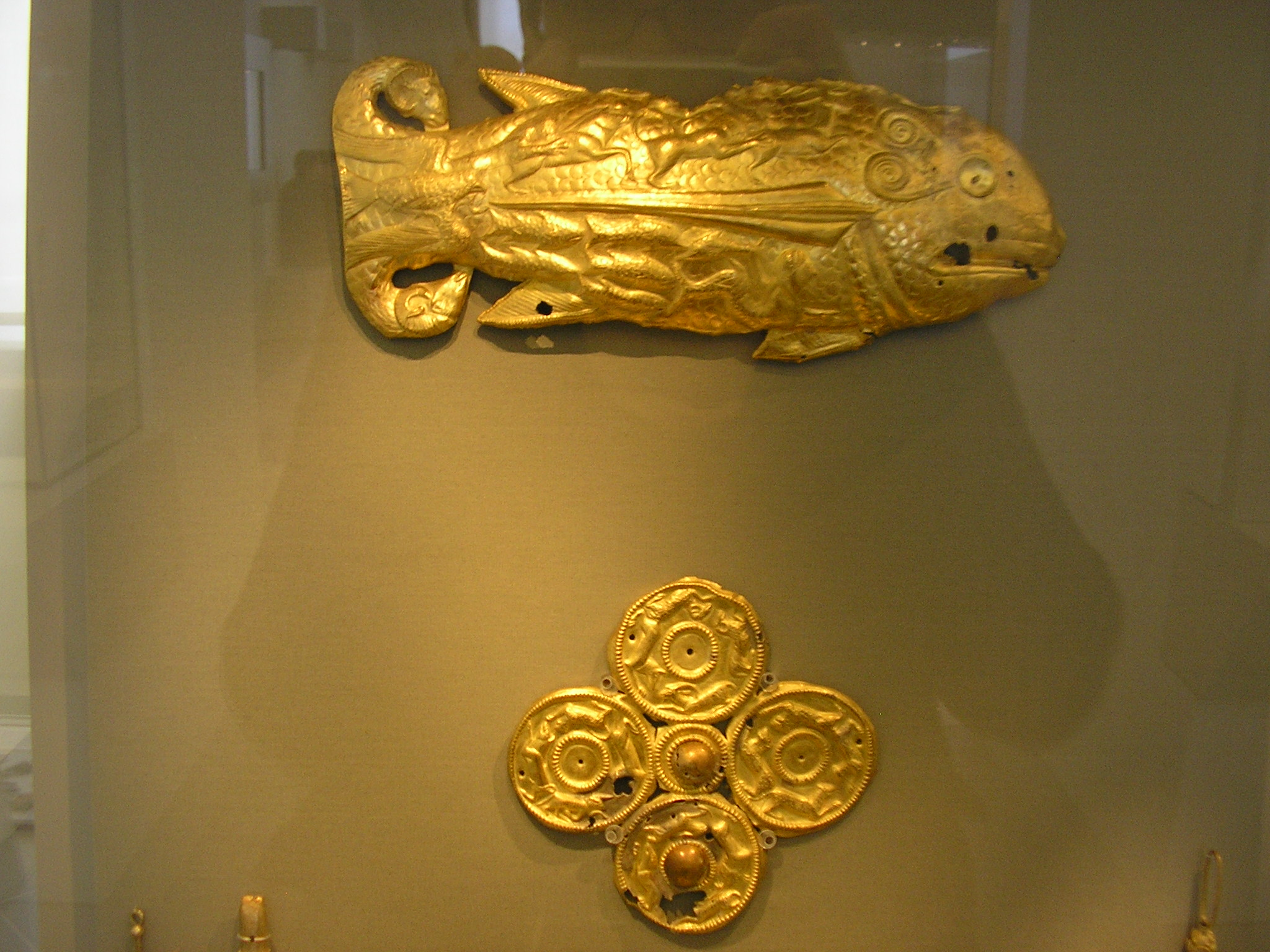
Two objects from the trove

The Vettersfelde Treasure or Witaszkowo Treasure is a treasure trove, which was found by chance in what was then Vettersfelde in the Province of Brandenburg (modern Witaszkowo, near Gubin, Poland) in 1882, and is now in the Antikensammlung Berlin. The objects in the trove are connected to the animal-themed art of the Scythians. The origin of the trove remains mysterious.

Among the most significant items in the trove are:

- an electrum plaque (41 x 15 cm, 608 g) in the shape of a fish, which probably dates to the end of the 6th century BC. According to Furtwängler, it was originally an ornament (sema) on a shield. The body of the fish is covered by little animals in relief, including a panther catching a boar, and a lion catching a deer, and the tail is made up of two rams' heads. It is believed to have been made by the artisans of an Ionian colony on the northern coast of the Black Sea, such as Olbia or Panticapaeum, to cater to the tastes of a Scythian prince.
- a golden plaque intended to cover the upper part of a sheath for an Acinaces (a type of dagger used by Scythians) and decorated with animals (fish, vultures, deer, boar). Length: 19 cm. 6th century BC.
- a golden object made up of four disks, each decorated with animals around a central boss, and a smaller central disk. It might have been part of a breast plate or a harness. Height: 17 cm. 6th century BC.

Other highlights include pendants of braided wire, a massive torc. Part of the find went to Berlin and was kept with a suit of Scythian armour, which dated from around 500 BC. Other, smaller objects from the trove were sold or melted down.

The discovery began a long scholarly debate. The presence of these objects so far into northern Europe was explained by a Scythian expedition into central Europe, with the trove forming the grave-offerings of a Scythian prince, who had made it to Brandenburg. One such expedition is attested at the end of the sixth century BC as a result of Darius' Scythian expedition (513 BC). Newer research on the find location argues that it might have been deposited as a sacrifice after being taken as booty from a Scythian prince. The presence of Scythians in this area is otherwise only suggested by the discover of three-fluted arrowheads, but these were regularly used by other Eurasian nomads.

Jerome M. Eisenberg (1992) fingered the most significant artifacts of the trove — the Vettersfelde fish, the four-disc plaque or "breastplate," and the dagger-sheath — as nineteeth-century forgeries, based on aesthetic criteria. Eisenberg observed that the fish's tail was nonsensically transformed into a ram's head, hypothesizing that this motif was copied by the forger from another work (which Eisenberg also claims was forged), a golden stag forming part of the Kul-Oba trove (unearthed circa 1830) whose rear antlers were also transformed into a ram's head. Eisenberg identifies the fish (as well as the Kul-Oba stag) as suffering from a modern horror vacui in which unadorned space must be filled "with extraneous, incongruous, or meaningless elements." He also notes the disparity in aesthetic styles between the "highly stylised eye[,] the realistic scales, the zoomorphic tail fins [and] the animal scenes," inferring that they may have been copied from several different sources.

== Bibliography ==
- Reallexikon der Germanischen Altertumskunde, sv. "Vettersfelde". Vol. 32, pp. 317–330
- Adolf Furtwängler. Der Goldfund von Vettersfelde. Berlin 1883 UB Heidelberg
