= Kul-Oba =

Scythian archaeological site

Coordinates: 45°20′57″N 36°22′54″E

Location of Kul-Oba

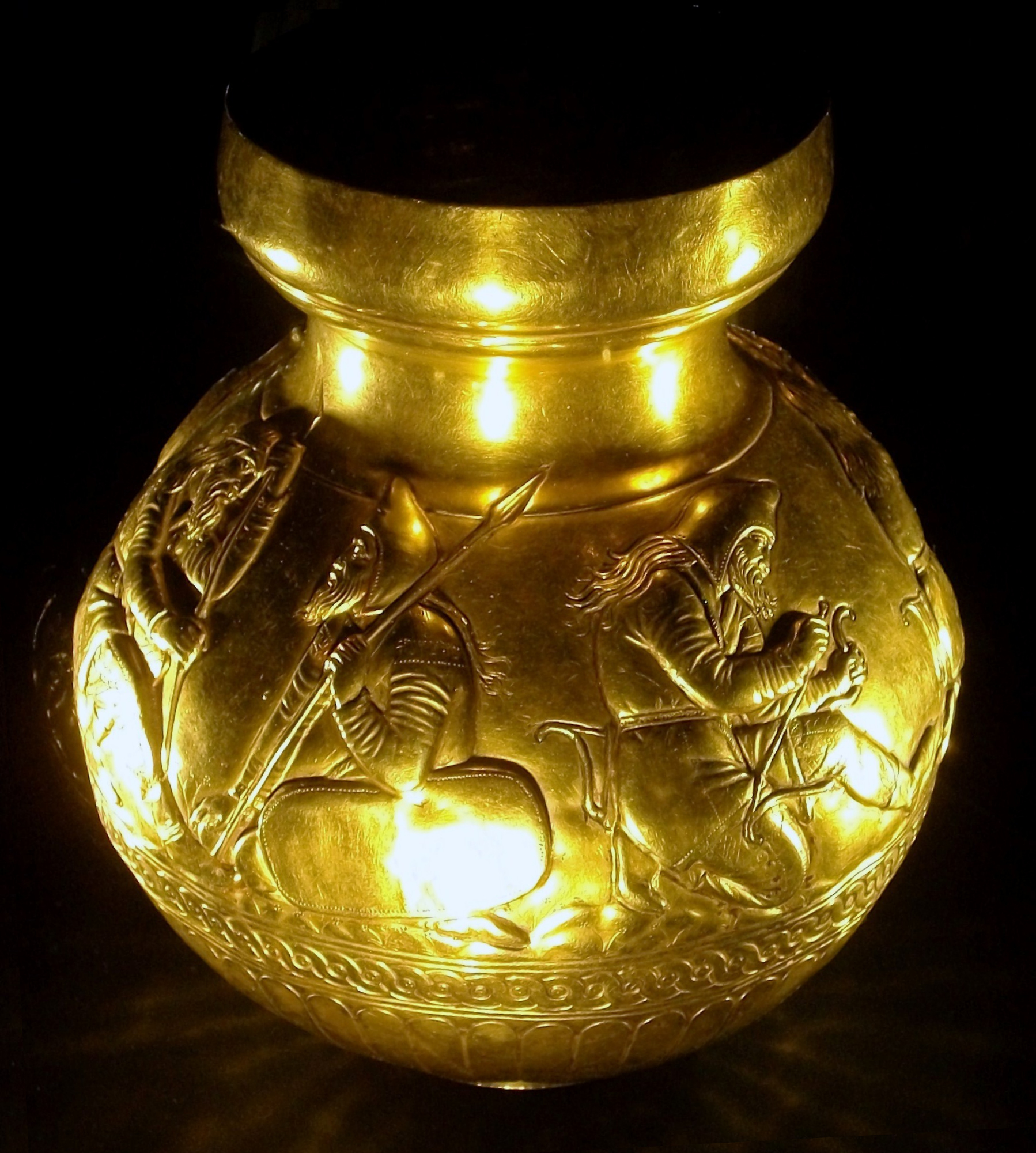
Electrum vase from the Kul-Oba kurgan, 2nd half of 4th century BC. (Hermitage Museum, St Petersburg)

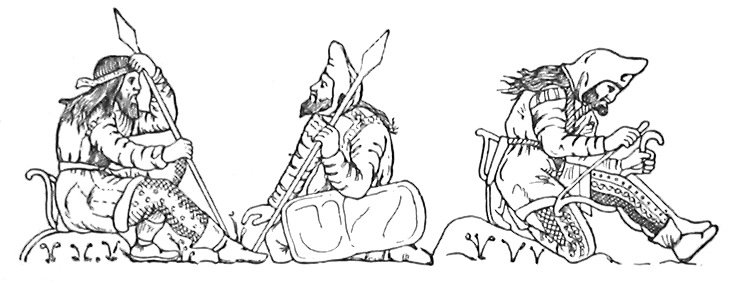
Scythians, drawing of figures on the vase above

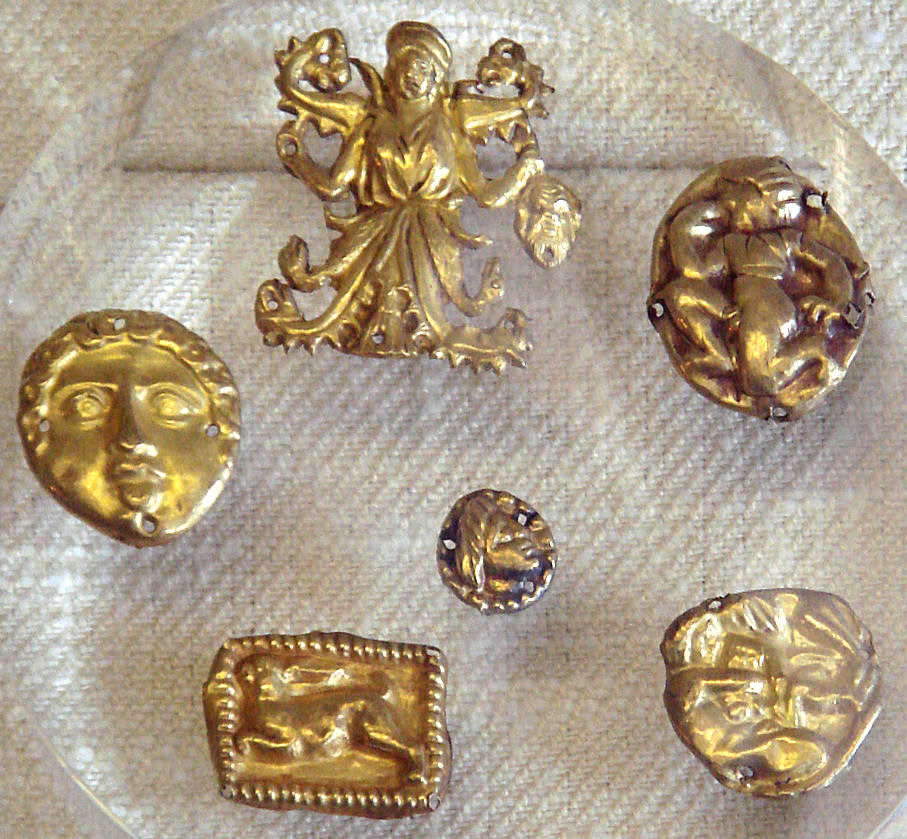
Gold pieces from Kul-Oba

Kul-Oba (Ukrainian: Куль-Оба; Russian: Куль-Оба, Crimean Tatar: Kül Oba; meaning "hill of ash" in Crimean Tatar) is an ancient archaeological site, a Scythian burial tumulus now called the Royal Kurgan, located near Kerch in eastern Crimea, on the right side of the M25 road to Feodosiya.

Kul-Oba was the first Scythian royal barrow to be excavated in modern times. Uncovered in 1830, the stone tomb yielded a wealth of precious artifacts which drew considerable public interest to Scythian world. Of particular interest is an intricately granulated earring with two Nike figurines, now in the Hermitage Museum, St. Petersburg.

The tomb was built around 400 to 350 BC, likely by a team of Greek masons from Panticapaeum. Its Plan is almost square, measuring 4.6 by 4.2 meters (15 by 14 ft). The stepped vault stands 5.3 meters (17 ft) high. The timber ceiling seems to have been designed to imitate a Scythian wooden tent; it is decorated by a canopy with gold plaques.

The body of the king lay by the east wall on a sumptuous wooden couch. His social position was highlighted by a diadem encircling his head, surmounted by a pointed felt headgear with gold pendants. His neck was decorated by a large gold disk weighing 461 grams. Each wrist was adorned with one to three bracelets. A separate section of the couch contained other grave goods, including a phial, a whip, a knife, and a quiver - all inlaid with gold or precious stones.

To the left of the couch stood a sarcophagus made of cypress wood and ivory. A woman, probably the king's wife or concubine, lay there. Apart from the brocaded dress, her body was decorated with an electrum diadem with large gold pendants, a pair of open-work earrings, a gold disk, a gold necklace, and two gold bracelets. At her side was placed a bronze hand-held mirror with the gilded handle. An electrum cup, placed between her feet, depicts scenes from Scythian mythology (illustrated, to the right).

The remains of a slave (probably a charioteer) were discovered by the south wall. A special niche in the wall contained horse bones, a helmet, a bronze sheath, and two spearheads. Several silver bowls and bronze cauldrons containing lamb bones were placed along the walls of the tomb. Inside the amphorae were residual traces of dried wine. A number of bronze arrow-heads were scattered around the floor.

The archaeologists in charge of the dig did not suspect there was a secret room underneath the tomb. Though it was discovered and plundered by treasure hunters, some of the missing valuables were subsequently retrieved by the Russian government.

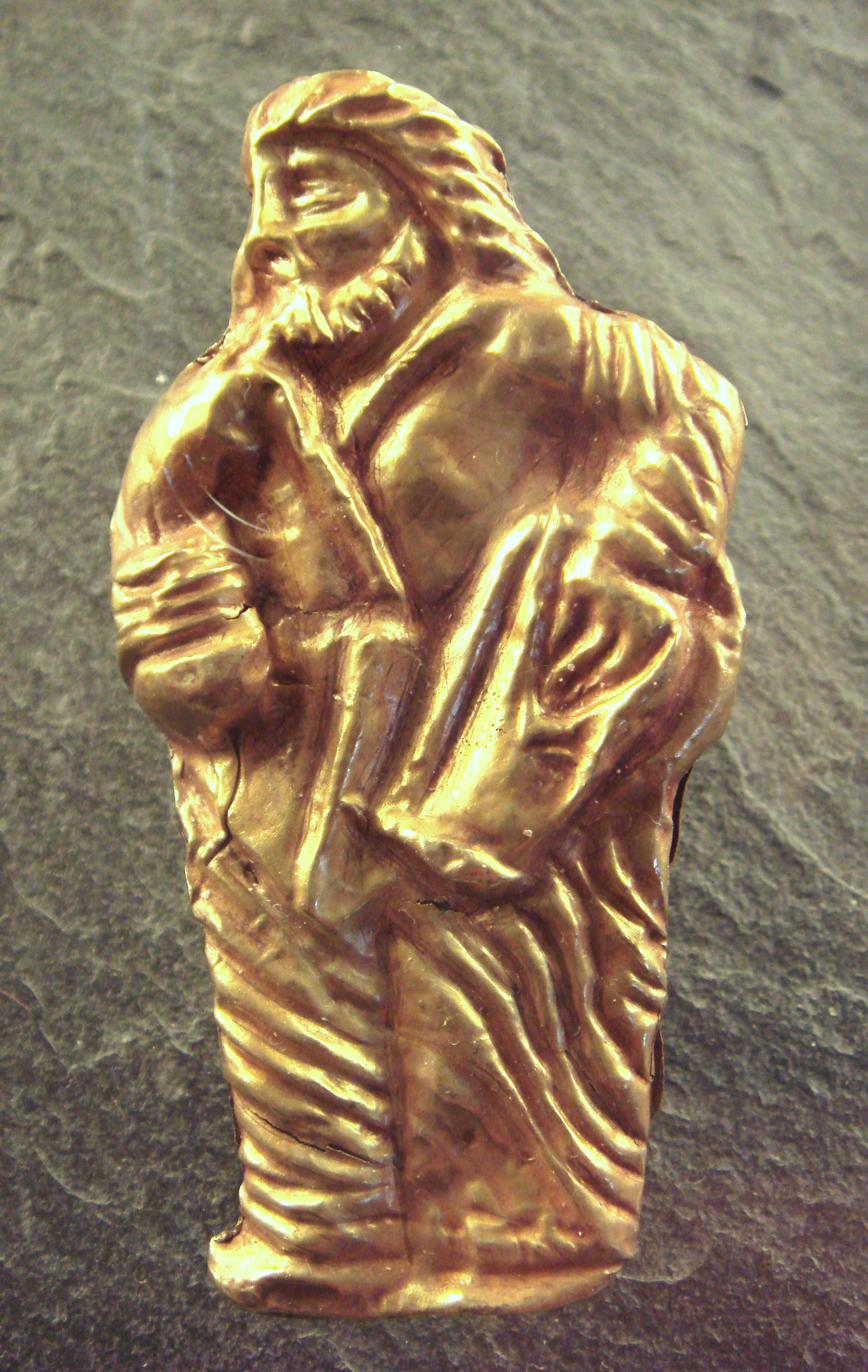
Scythian man, Kul Oba

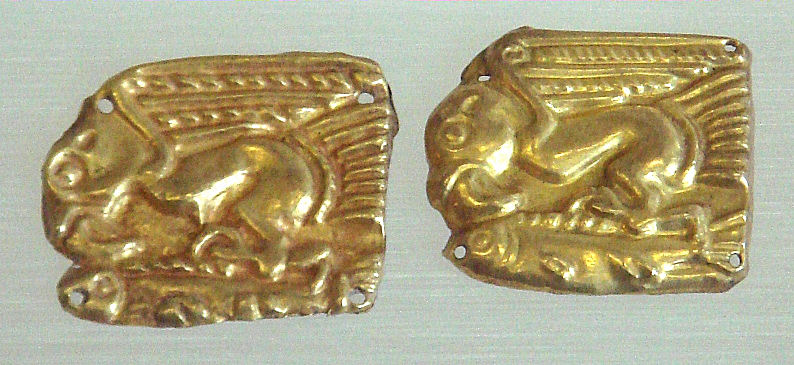
Kul-Oba sphinx

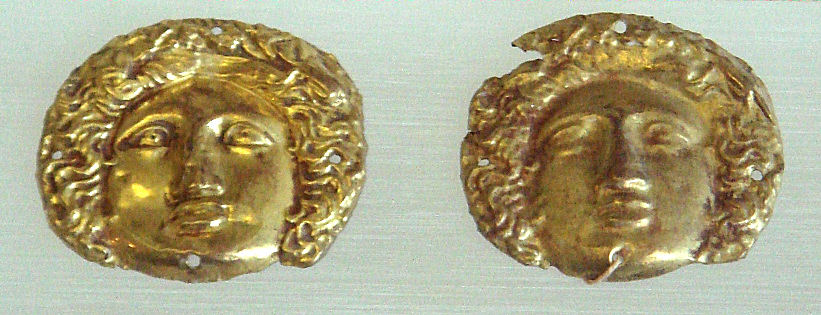
Kul-Oba faces.

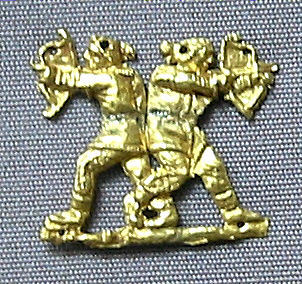
Gold clothing appliqué, showing two Scythian archers, probably from Kul-Oba.

== See also ==
- Martynivka Treasure
- Pereshchepina Treasure

== Sources ==
- Michael Rostovtzeff. Scythia and the Bosporus. Leningrad, 1925.
