= Melitopol Museum of Local History =

Ukrainian history museum

- Ukrainian: Мелітопольський краєзнавчий музей Russian: Мелитопольский городской краеведческий музей
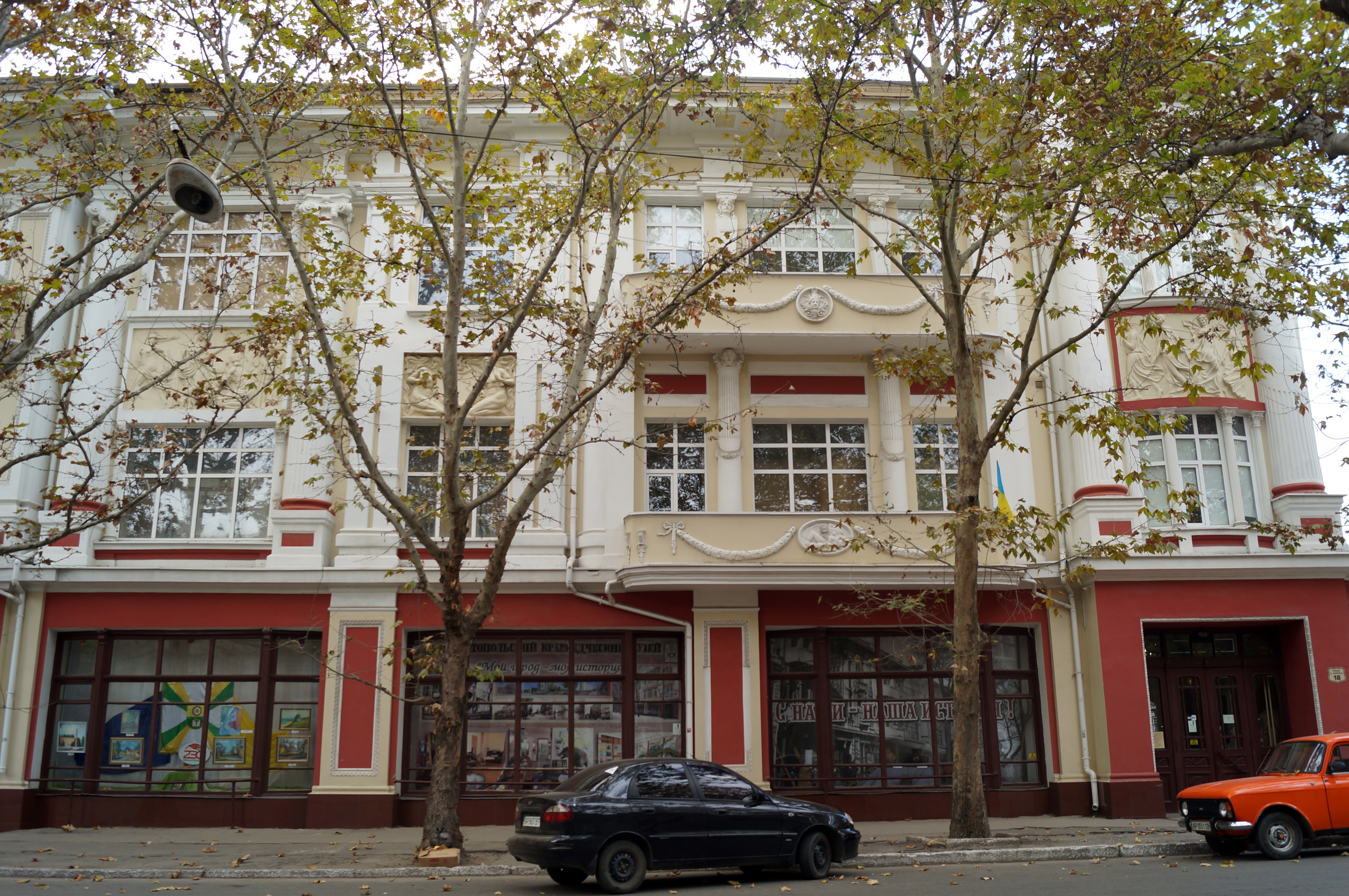
- Established: 1900
- Location: Melitopol, Ukraine
- Coordinates: 46°50′43″N 35°22′53″E
- Collections: Social history, art, archaeology, natural science, numismatics
- Collection size: 60,000
- Founder: D. Serdyukov
- Website: melitopol-history.org

Melitopol Museum of Local History (Ukrainian: Мелітопольський краєзнавчий музей; Russian: Мелитопольский городской краеведческий музей) is a museum in Melitopol, Ukraine. It exhibits objects relating to the history and nature of the region. The museum is located in the former Chernikov Mansion, built in 1913. As of 2022 its director was Leila Ibragimova.

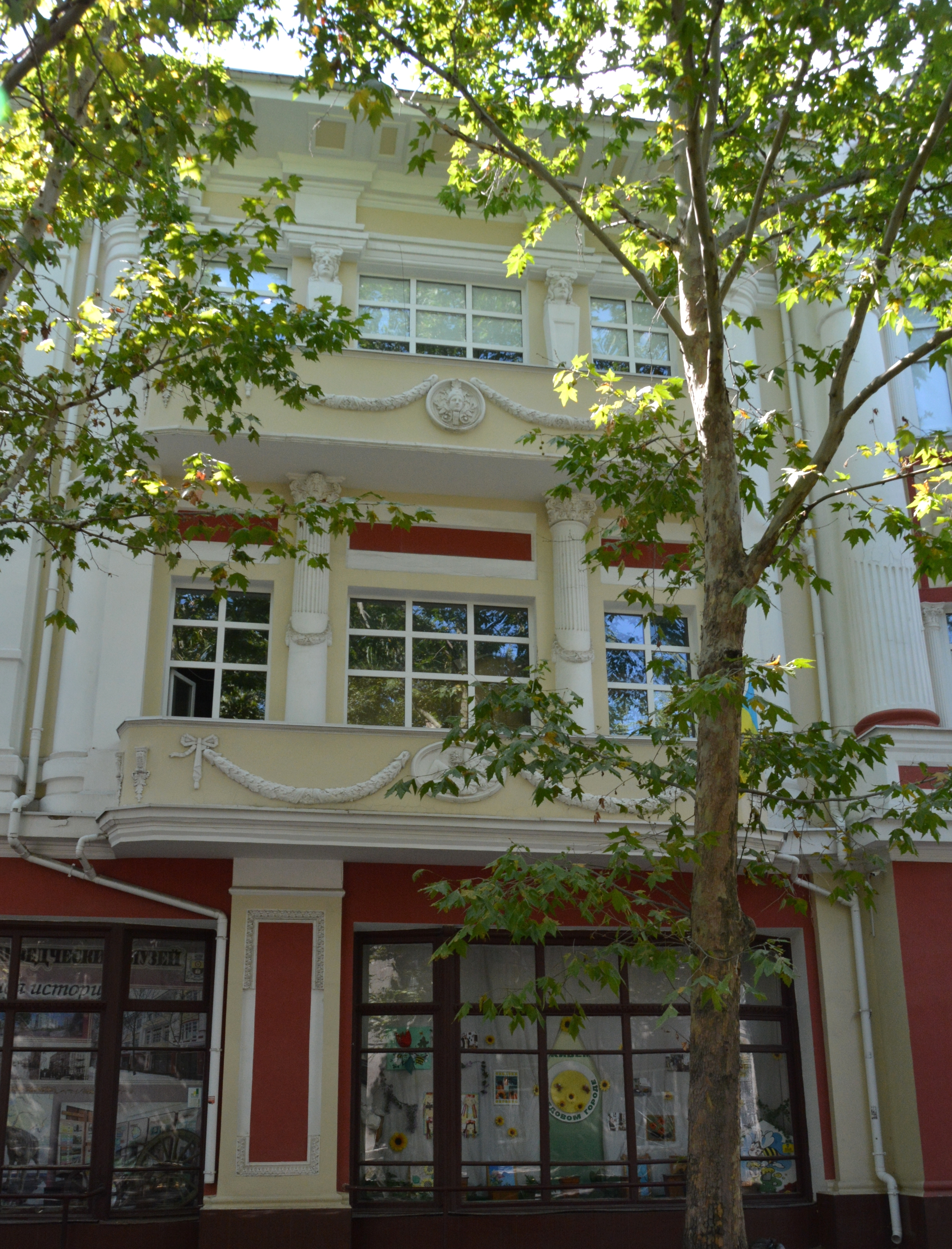
The building with the shop of the merchant Chernov (now the city museum of local history), Melitopol, st. Karl Marx, 18

== History ==
The museum's collection began in 1900, when the Melitopol Zemstvo bought a collection of 180 taxidermied birds for 750 roubles. In 1910, the collection of the Zemstvo was combined with the collection of the Melitopol Real School. On 1 May 1921, the Melitopol Regional Museum opened in a building on Dzerzhinsky Street and the first director of the museum was teacher D. Serdyukov.

As of 1928, the museum occupied three small rooms and a corridor. The three rooms included historical and natural, as well as ethnographic and archaeological departments. Although the museum had many exhibits, the lack of space and unsystematic organization of museum material, according to museum director I. P. Kurylo-Krymchak, made access to the collection difficult.

In the early 1930s, Kurylo-Krymchak launched extensive conservation work, protecting the nature reserves of the North Pryazovia from capture for agricultural purposes. However, in January 1935, he was sacked from the museum and arrested. During the Second World War he was appointed mayor of Melitopol by the Germans and resumed the work in the museum, once again as its director.

In 1967, the museum moved to the former Chernikov mansion on Karl Marx Street (now Mykhailo Hrushevsky Street). From 1971, the director of the museum was BD Mikhailov. In 1972, the diorama "Assault by Soviet troops of the Wotan line in October 1943" was created in the museum.

On 10 March 2022, after the Russian attack on the city, the director of the museum, Leila Ibragimova, was arrested at her home by Russian forces, and was detained in an unknown location. It was also reported that Russian troops stole a collection of Scythian gold, which was discovered by archaeologists in the 1950s. In all, Russian troops looted at least 198 gold items, rare old weapons, centuries-old silver coins and special medals, Ibragimova said.

== Building ==
The three-story mansion of merchant Ivan Chernikov of the Second Guild was built in 1913. The interiors of the building are richly decorated with artistic stucco. Ivan Egorovich Chernikov was twice elected chairman of the Melitopol City Council - from 1891 to 1895, and from 1901 to 1905. The Chernikov brothers owned a trading house that specialized in supplying the manufacturers of Melitopol. On the first floor of Chernikov's mansion there was a shop selling sewing machines of the American company "Singer", and the two upper floors of the house were residential facilities.

In 1917, the Chernikov family emigrated to France. From June to October 1920, the building housed the headquarters of General Wrangel. In the 1920s and 1930s, the building housed work clubs. During the Second World War, the mansion housed the German commandant's office, and after the liberation of Melitopol it housed the committees of the Communist party and the Komsomol. On the ground floor of the building a savings bank operated for many years. In 1967 the city authorities transferred the building to the Museum of Local History.

== Collections ==
The collection at the Melitopol Museum of Local History consists of approximately 60,000 objects. It houses a unique collection of Scythian gold of the fourth century BC, obtained as a result of excavations of the Melitopol kurgan. The museum has a numismatic collection, which includes coins, orders and medals, tokens, seals, badges and banknotes. Much of the collection was obtained in 1986 as a result of the accidental discovery of a collection of silver coins of 1895-1925. The textiles collection reflects the distinctive features of the different districts of Melitopol. The decorative arts collection includes items of antique furniture, porcelain and pottery. The natural collection includes geological, paleontological, botanical, zoological and entomological specimens.

The museum also has a collection of historic photographs, books and documents that record aspects of the economic, political, and cultural life of Melitopol. The art collection includes works by the artist Alexander Grigoryevich Tishler, who was from the city. Another significant object in the collection is the Doukhobor Memorial Stone, which was carved in the nineteenth century by Doukhobors who were being exiled from their home near Melitopol to the village of Bogdanovka (Starobogdanovka).

Many of the items were looted by Russian soldiers during the 2022 Russian invasion of Ukraine.

== Gallery ==
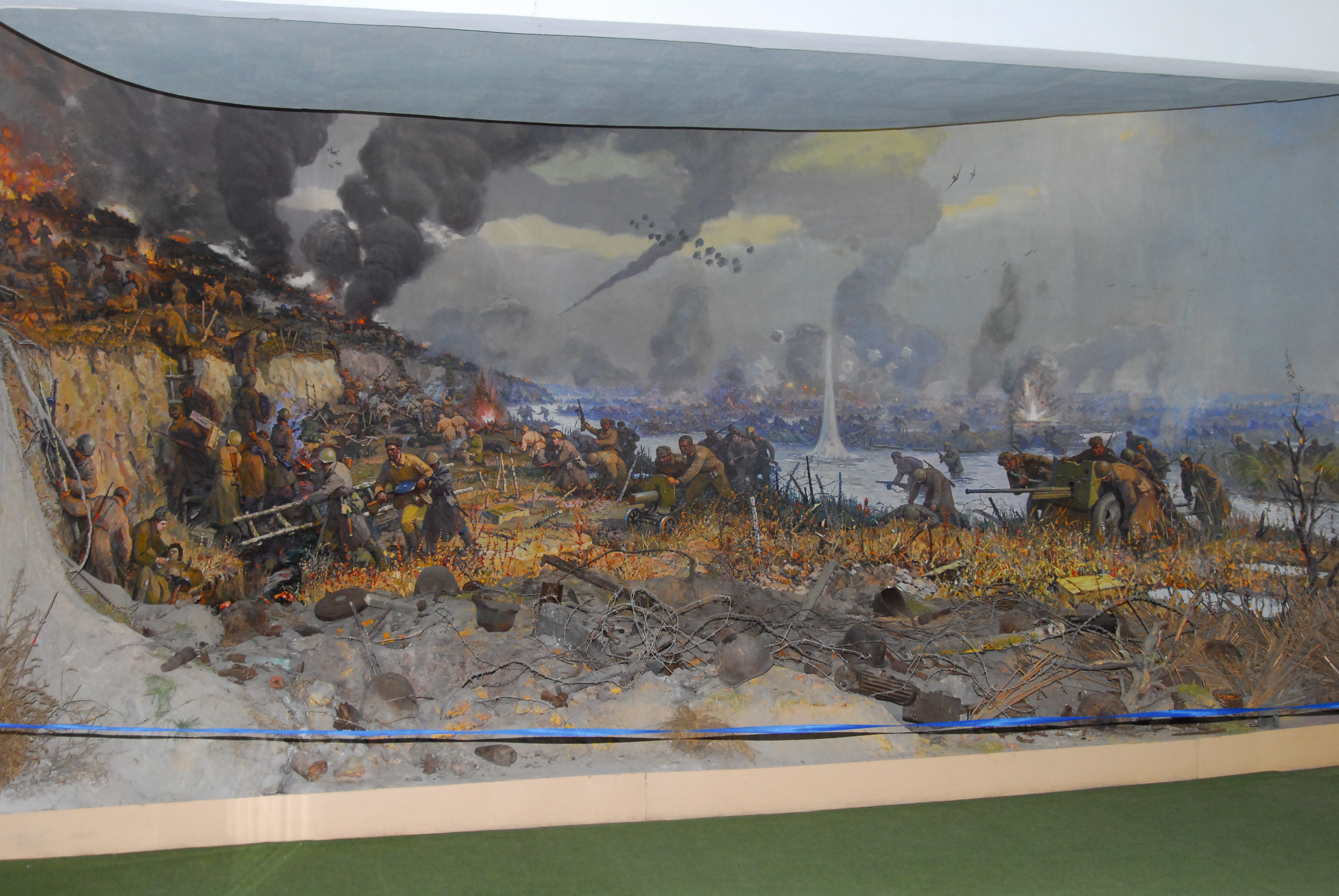
Diorama of a combat

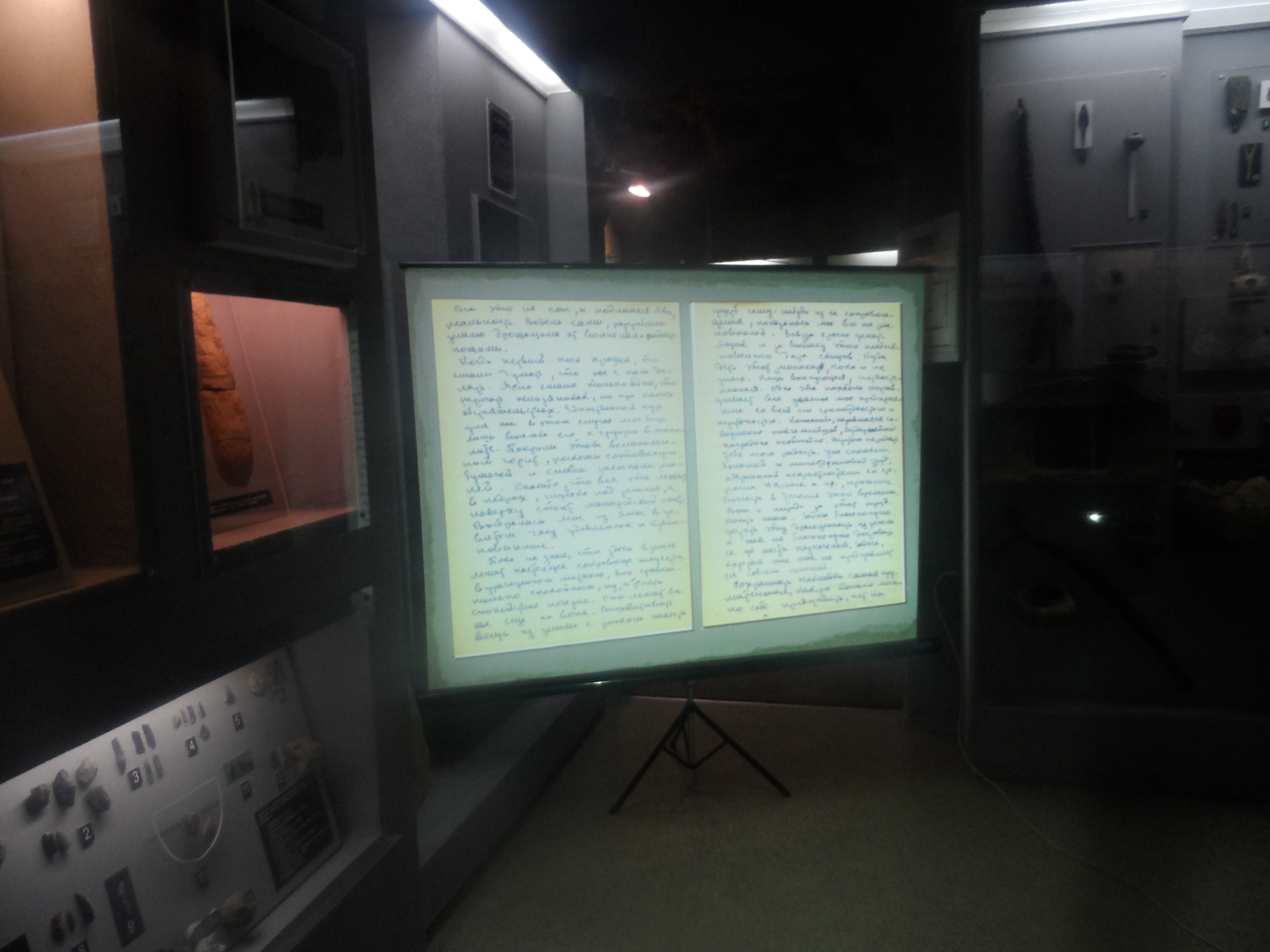

=== Animal Exhibition Hall ===
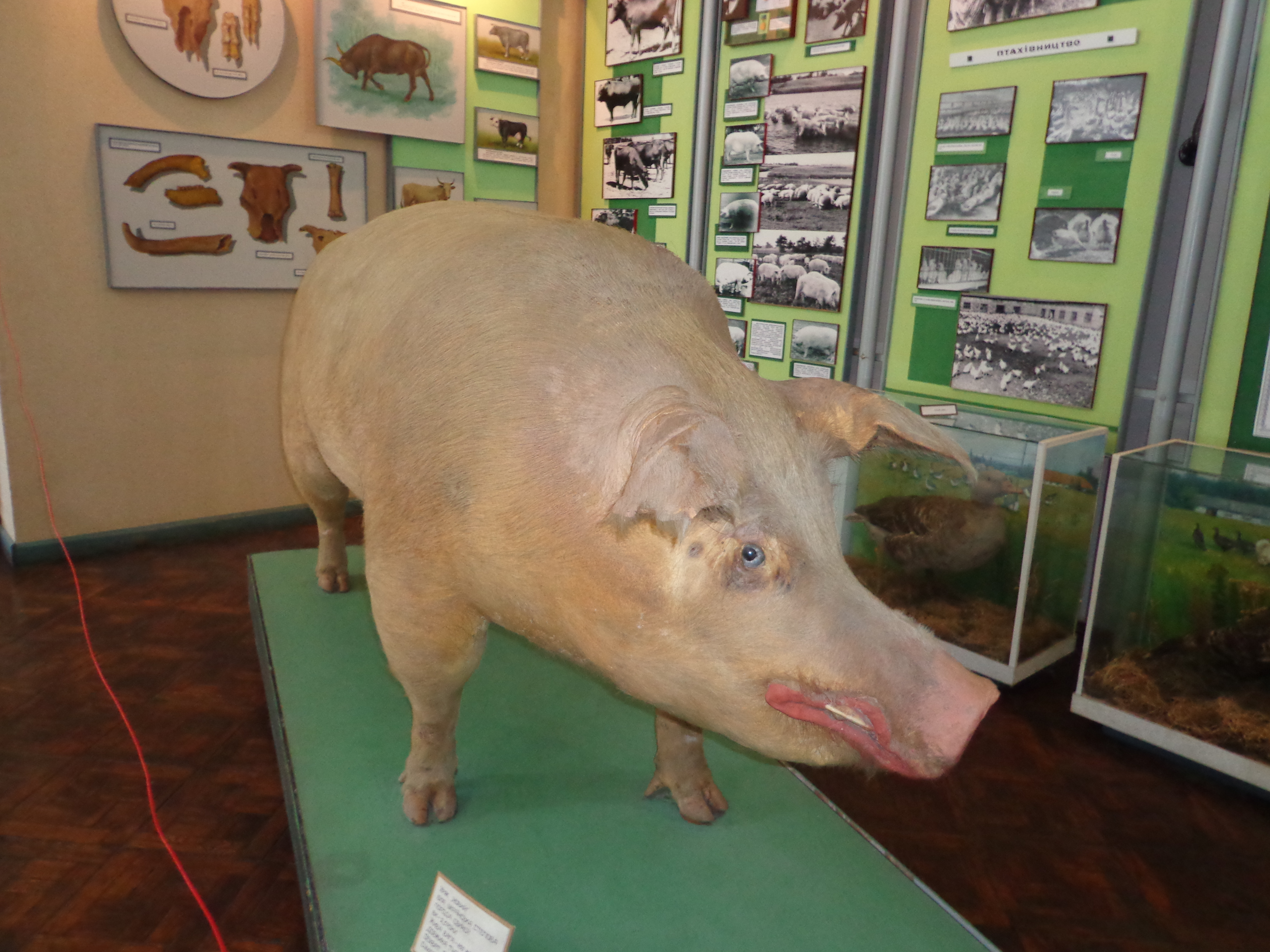
Stuffed hog

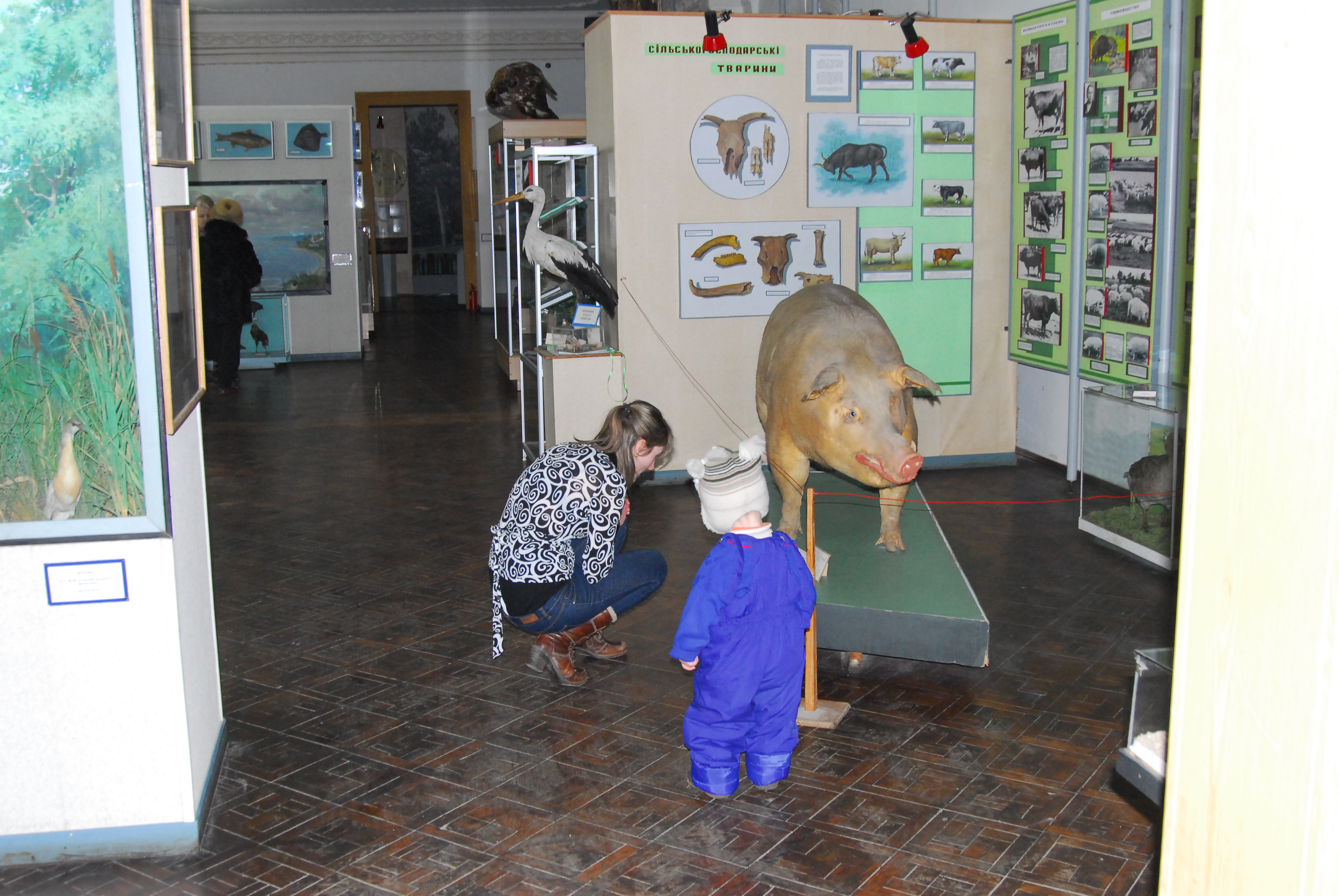
collections in the animal exhibition hall

=== Folk Display ===
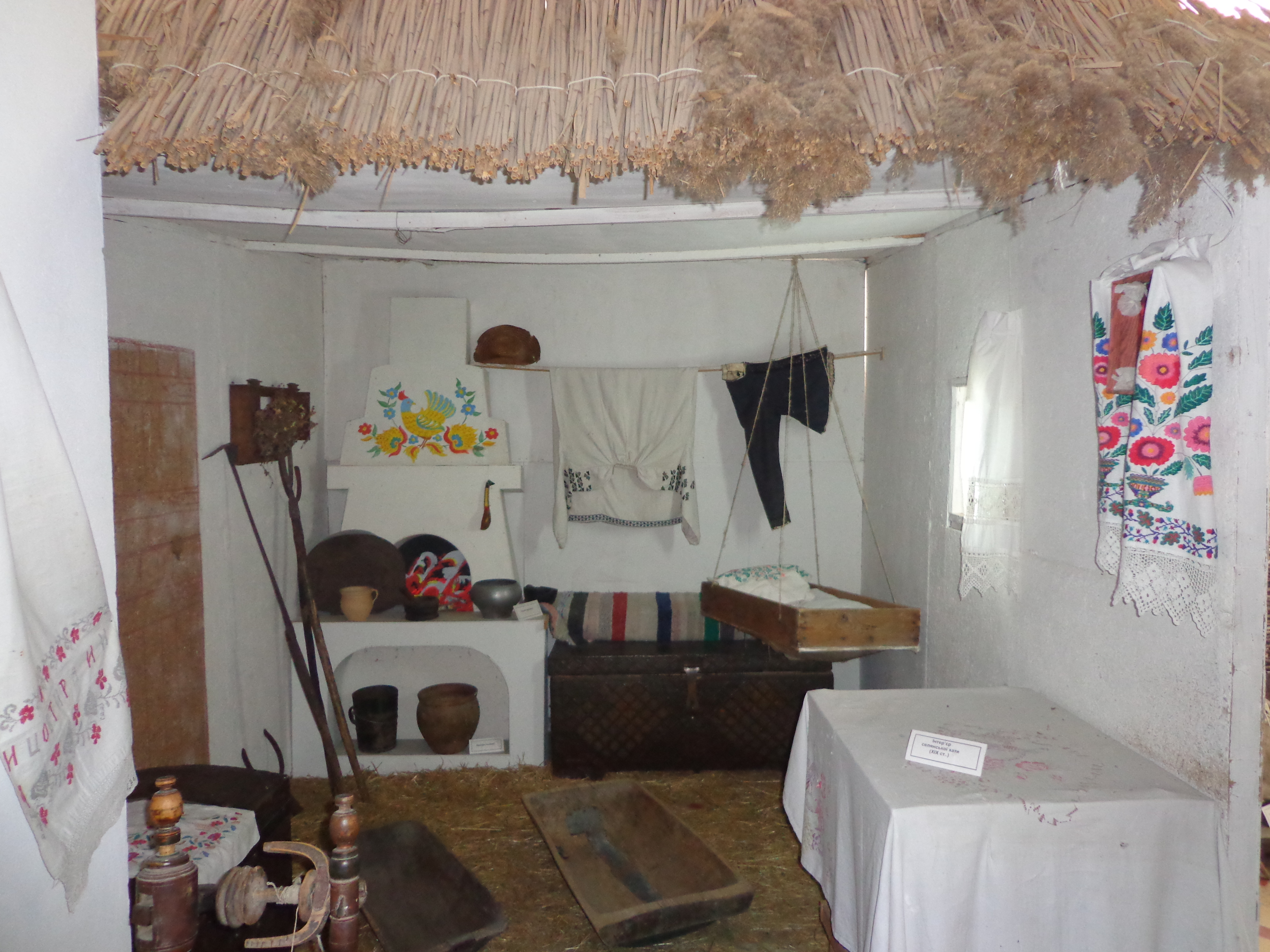
Interior of a Ukrainian peasant house of the 19th century

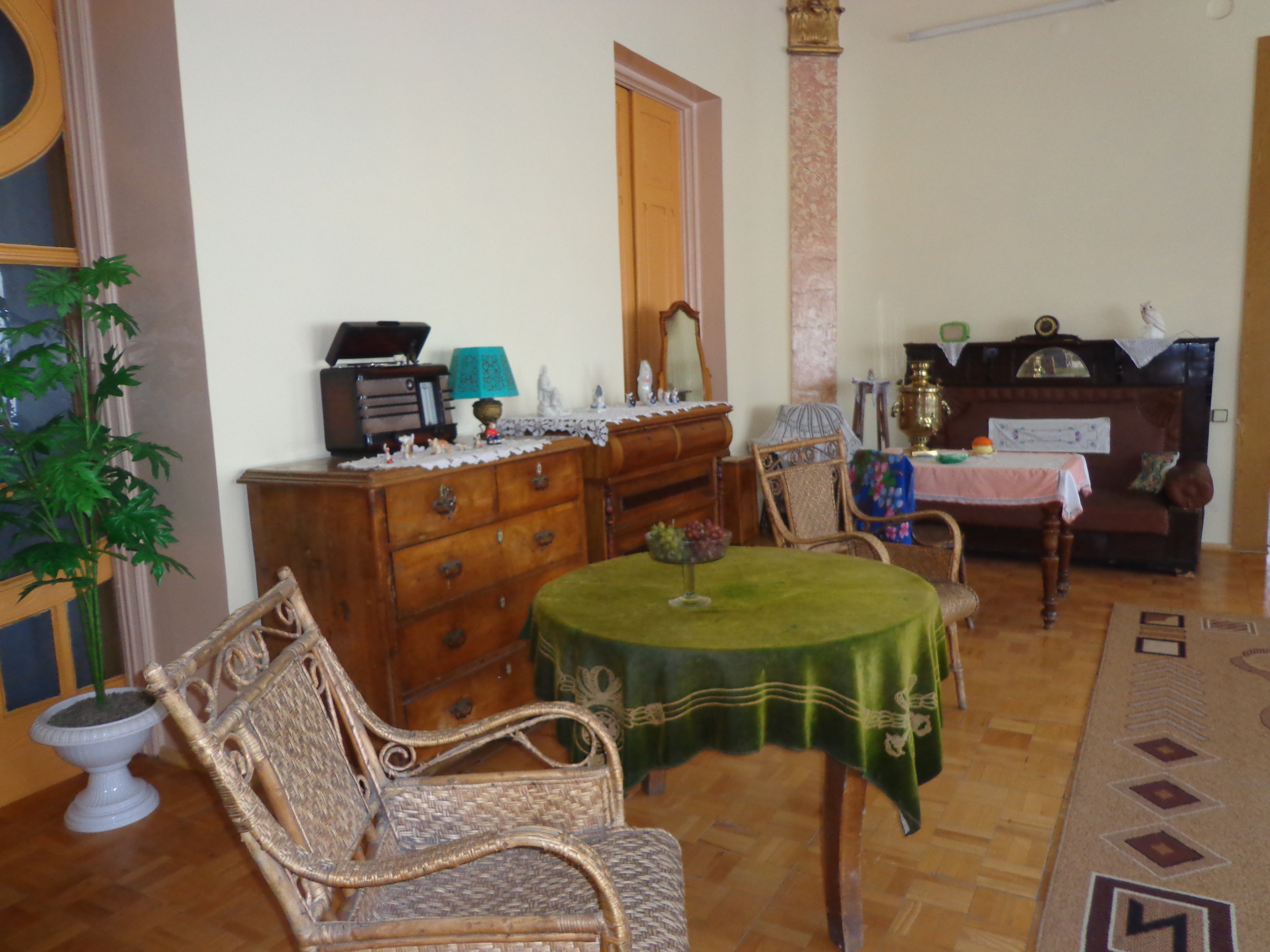
Interior of the beginning of the 20th century

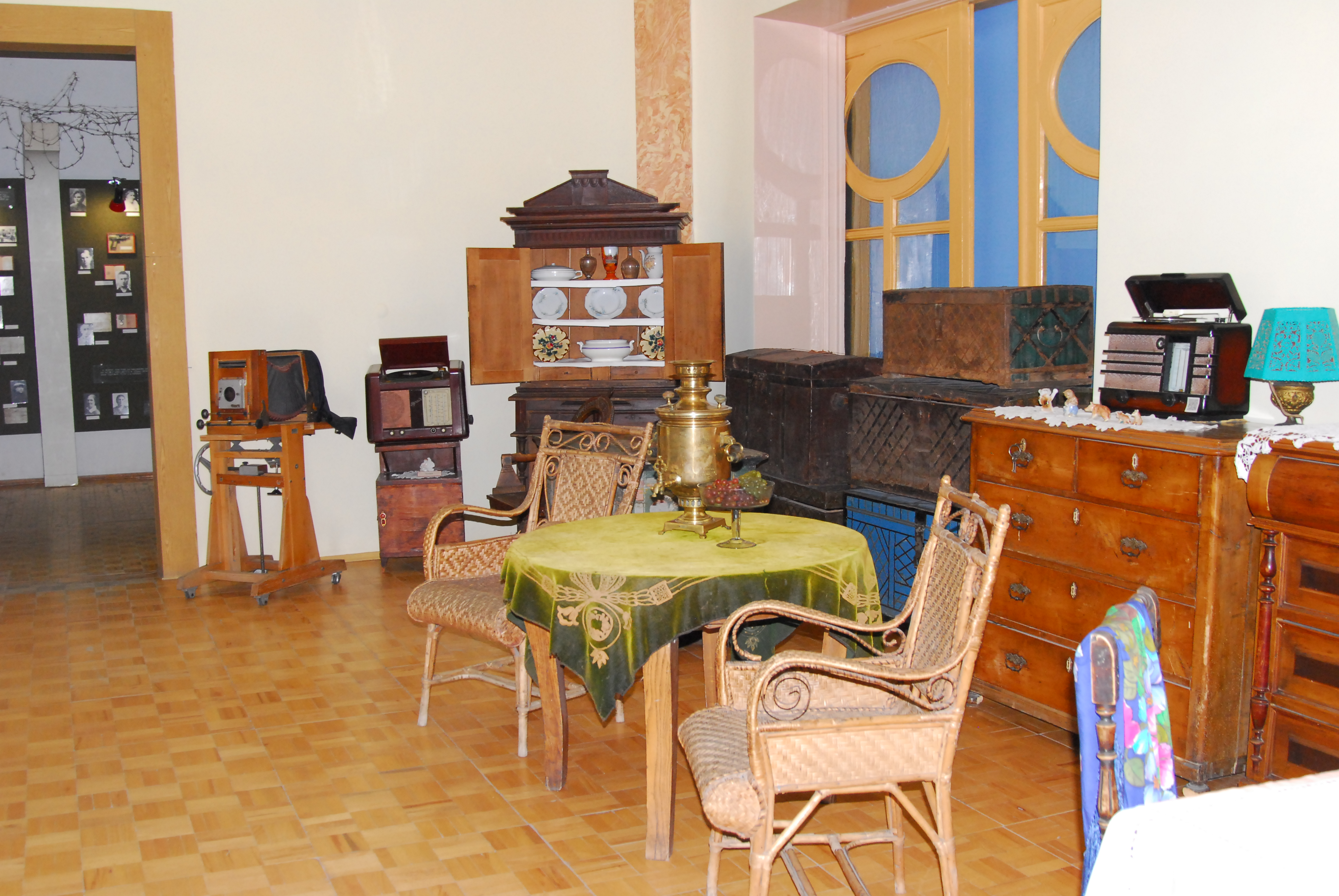
Early 20th century interior

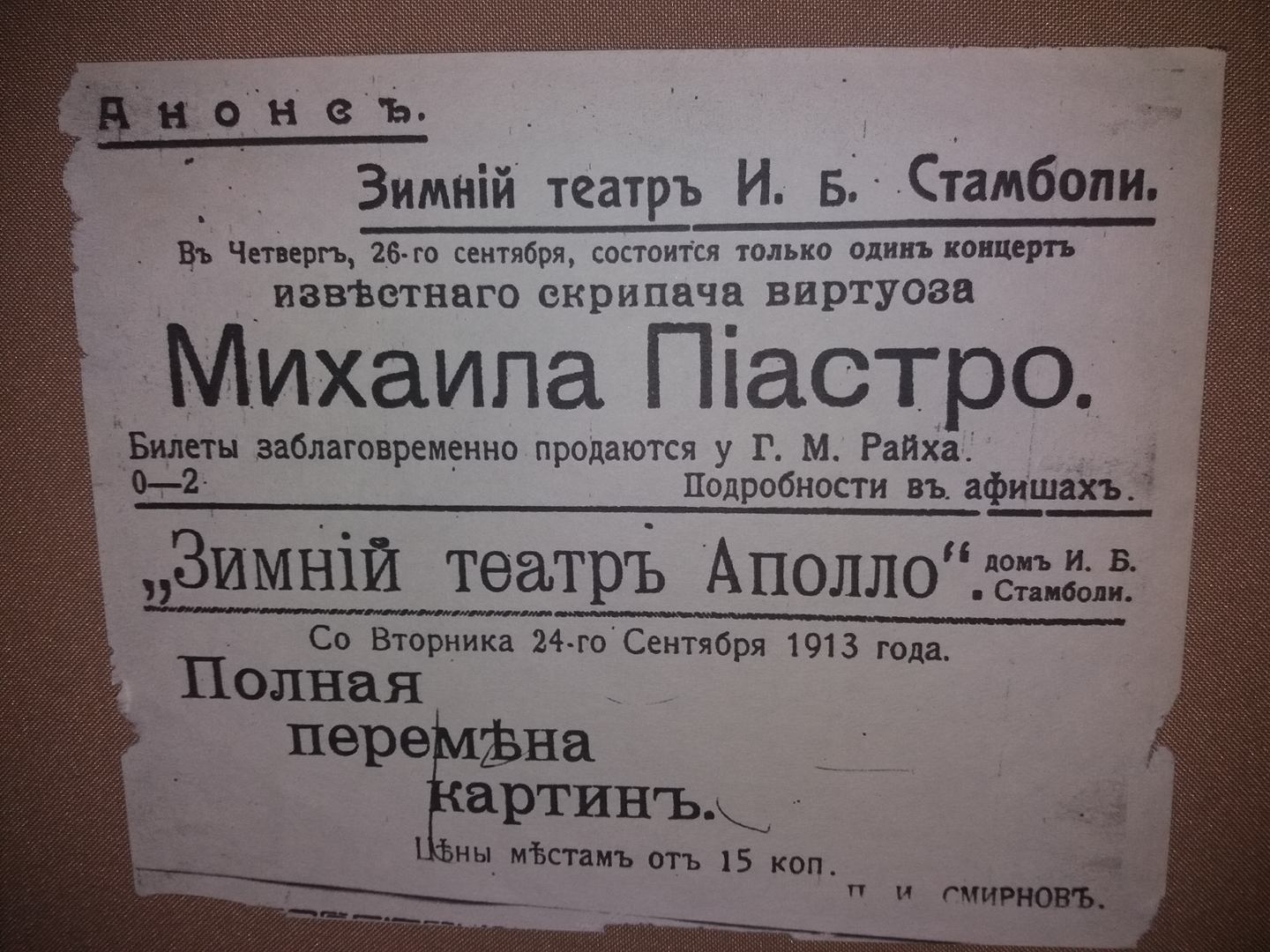
A piece of a 1913 newspaper, translating to: "Announcement. Winter theater I. B. Istanbul. On Thursday, September 26th, there will be only one concert of the famous virtuoso violinist Mikhail Piastro. Tickets are sold in advance from G. M. Reich. Details in the poster. "Winter Theater Apollo". Stamboli. From Tuesday 24th September 1913. A complete change of pictures. I'm sorry from 15 kopecks. T.T.SMIRNOV"

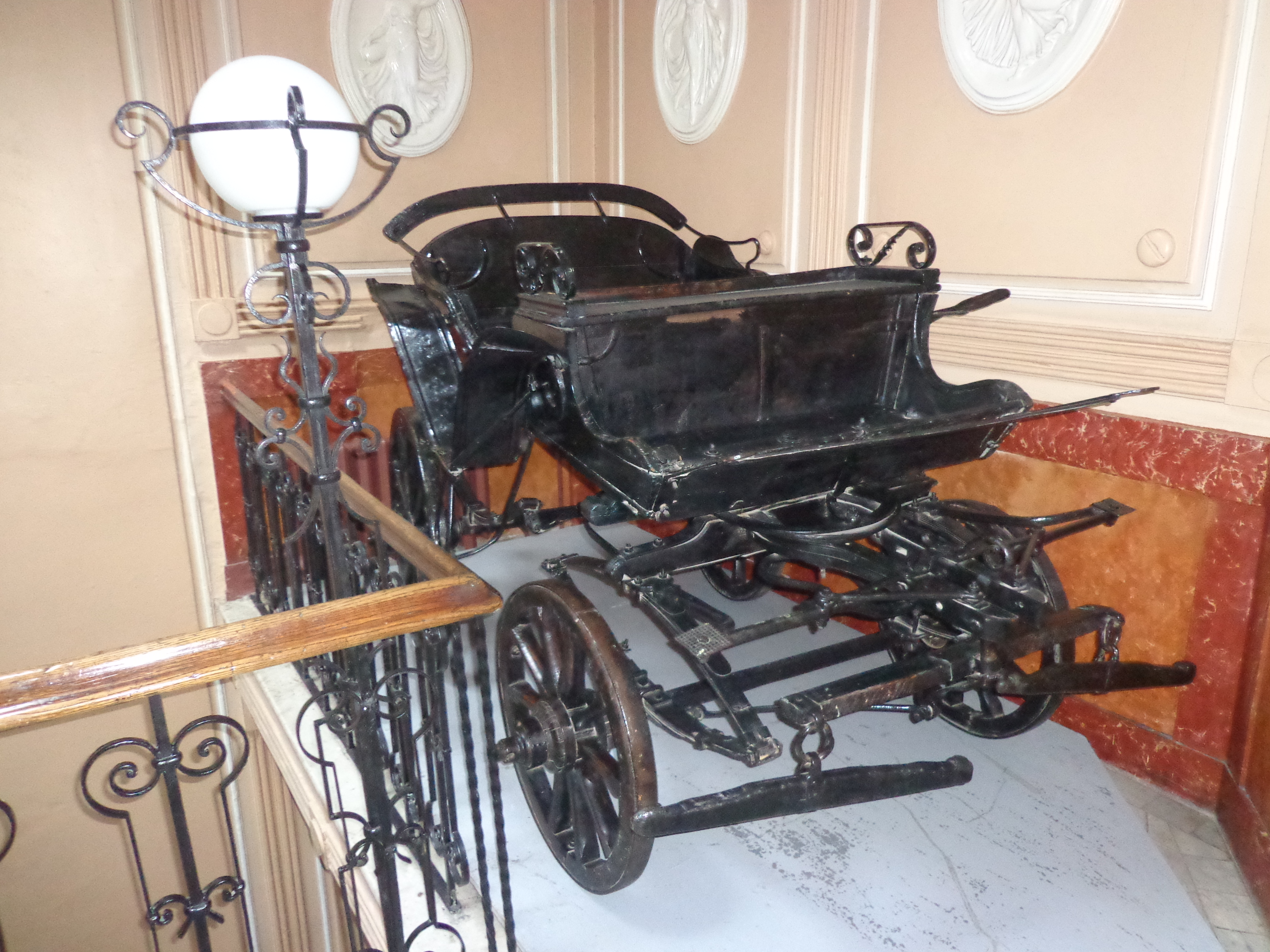
Machinegun cart of 1920

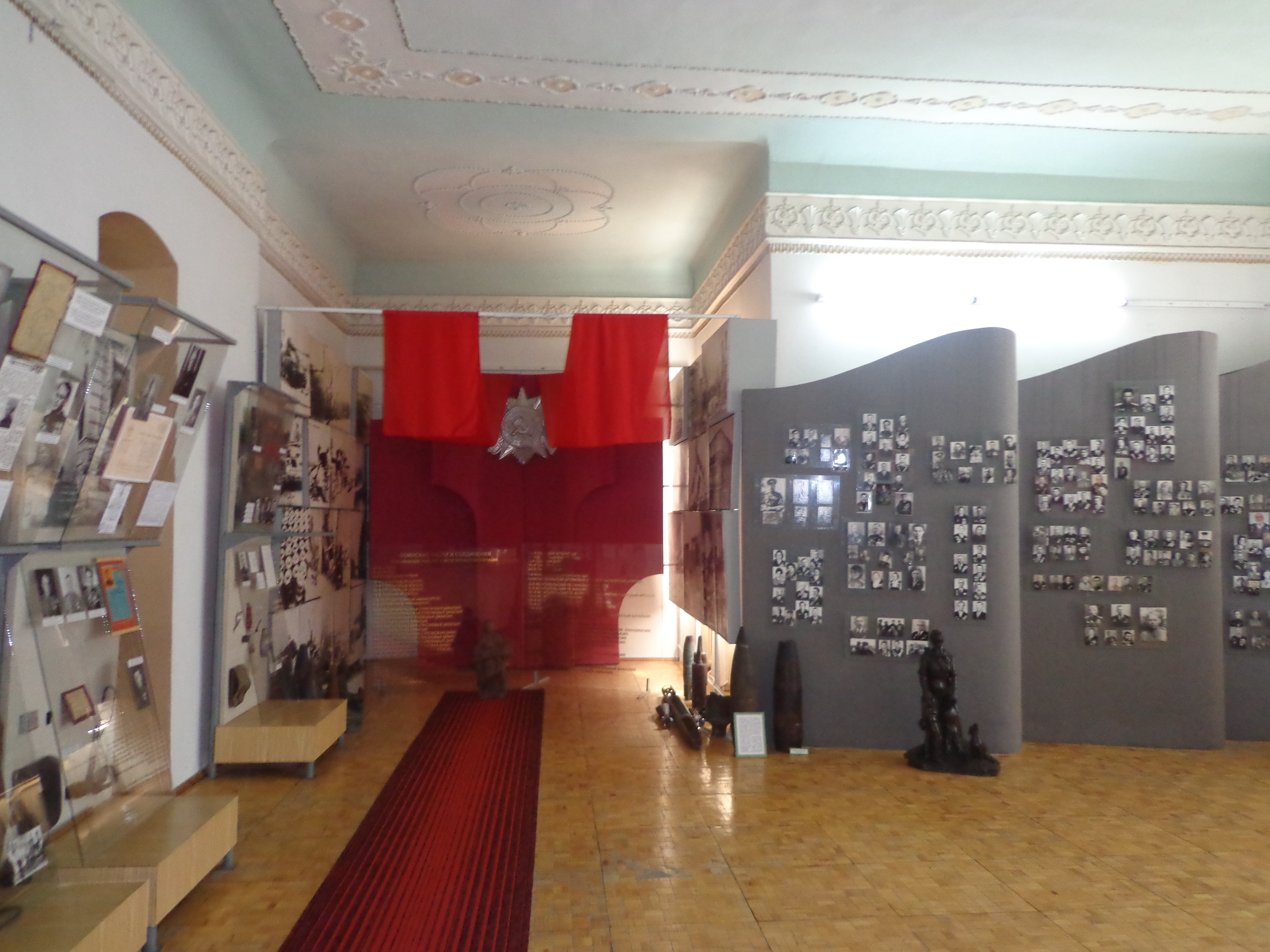
Exposition dedicated to World War II

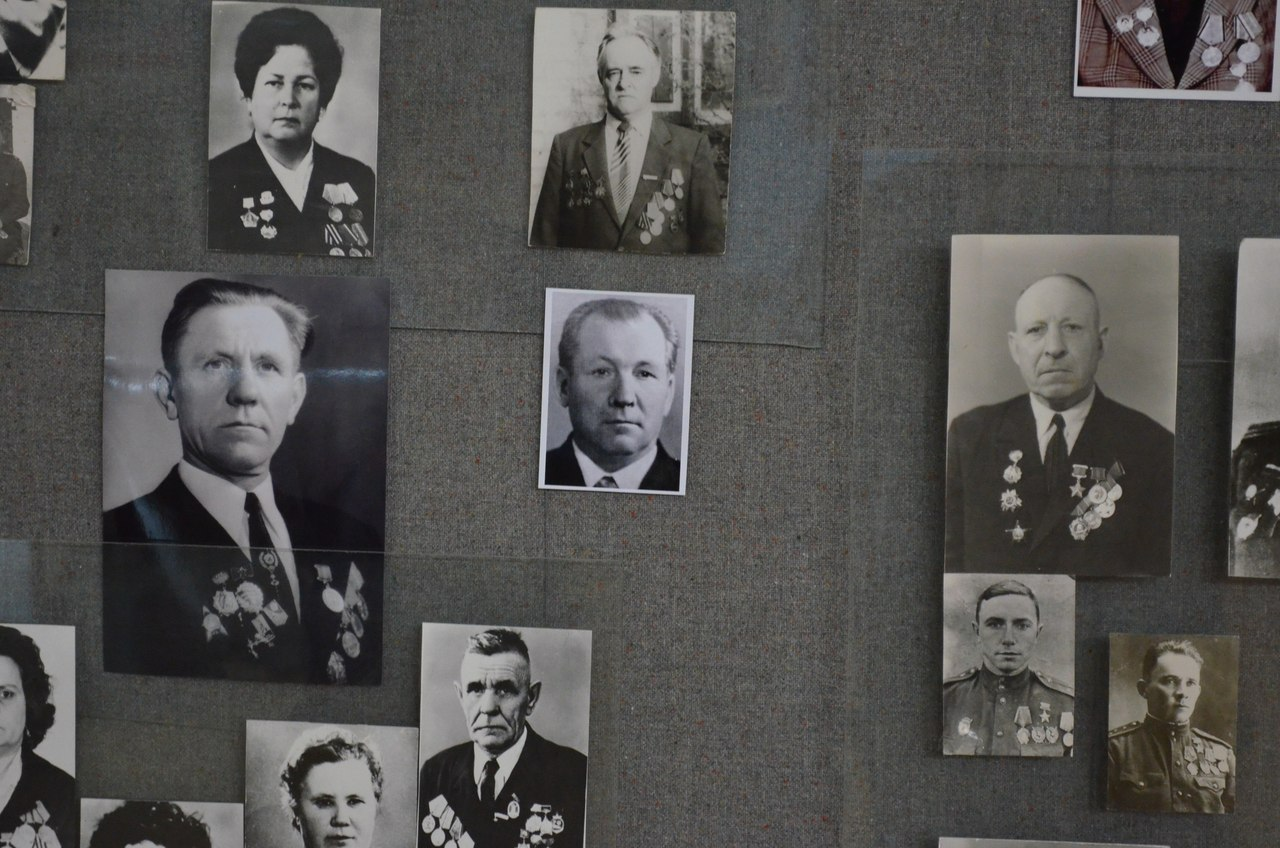

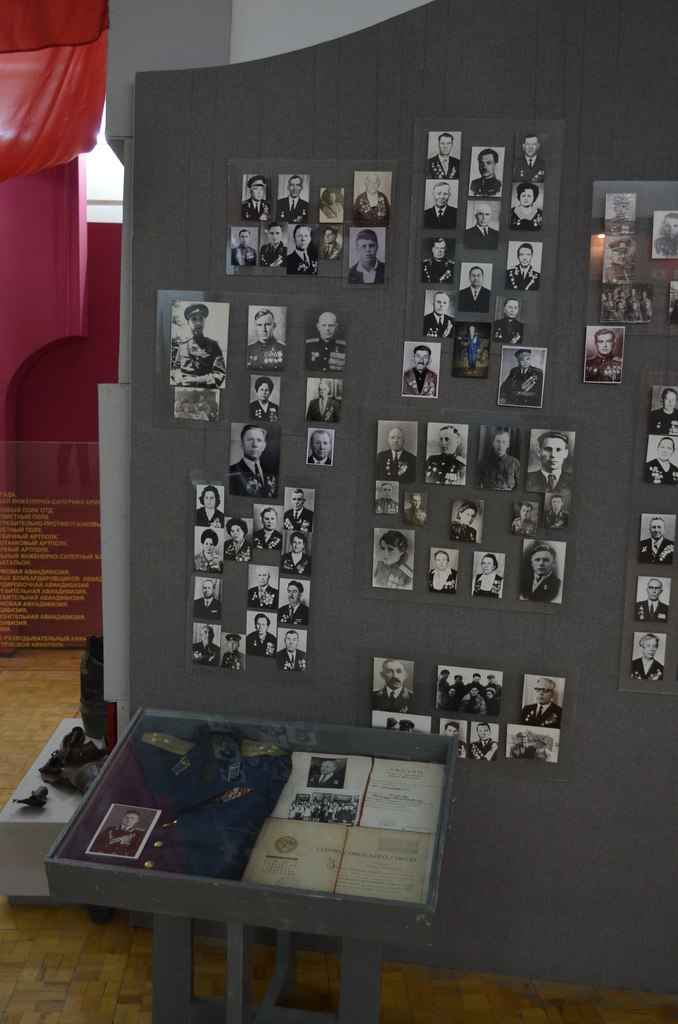
In the exposition on the "waves of memory" of Semyon Savelievich Malyshkin (1918–1999)

=== Fossils ===
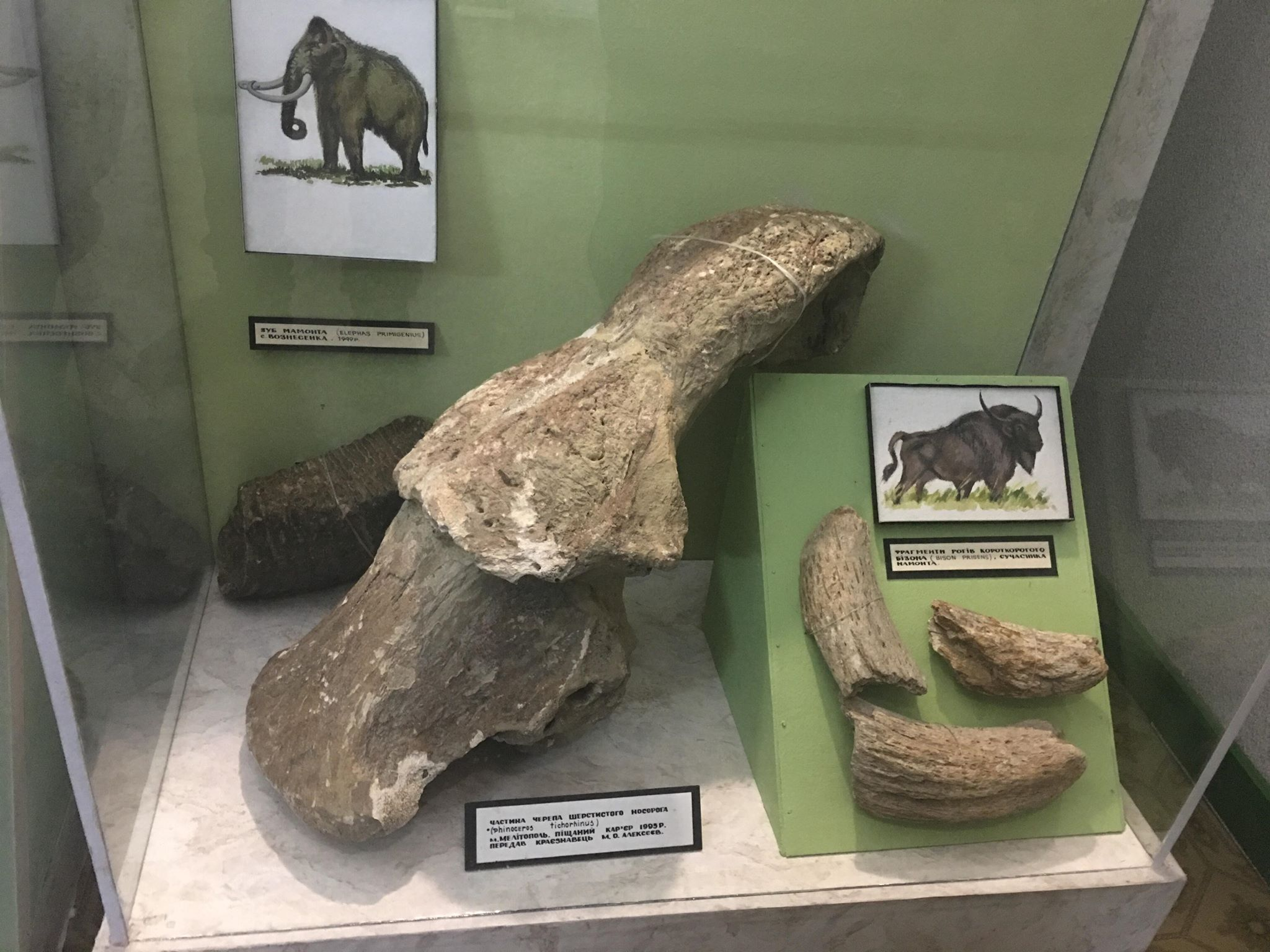
Ice Age fauna of a rhinoceros trichorhina at the museum

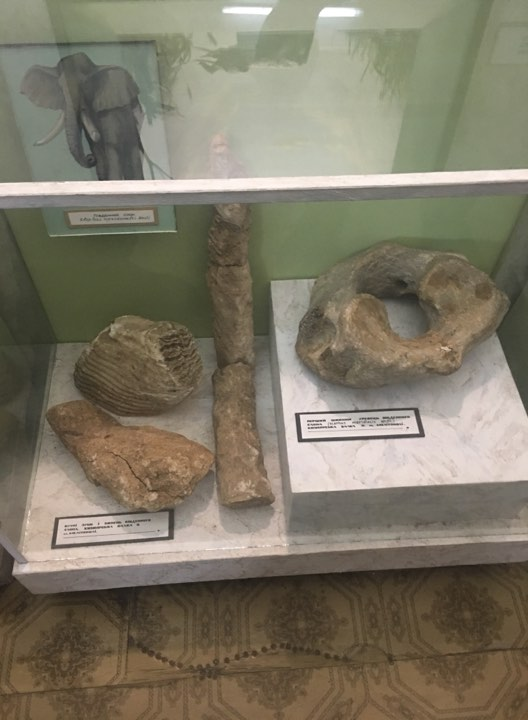
Ice Age fauna of a Chinese Elephant

=== Melitopol kurgan ===
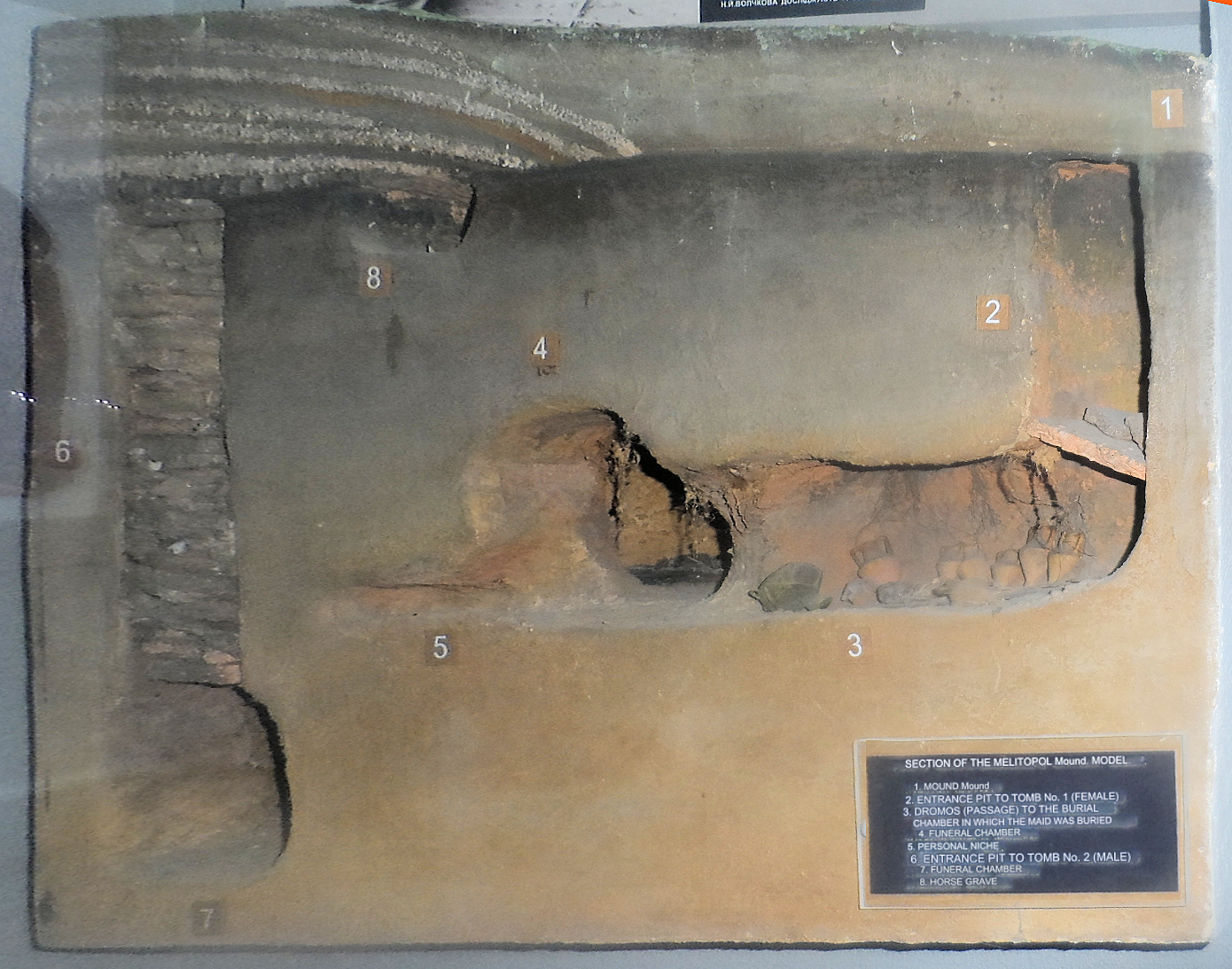
Burial horse grave Model of the excavation of the Melitopol kurgan.

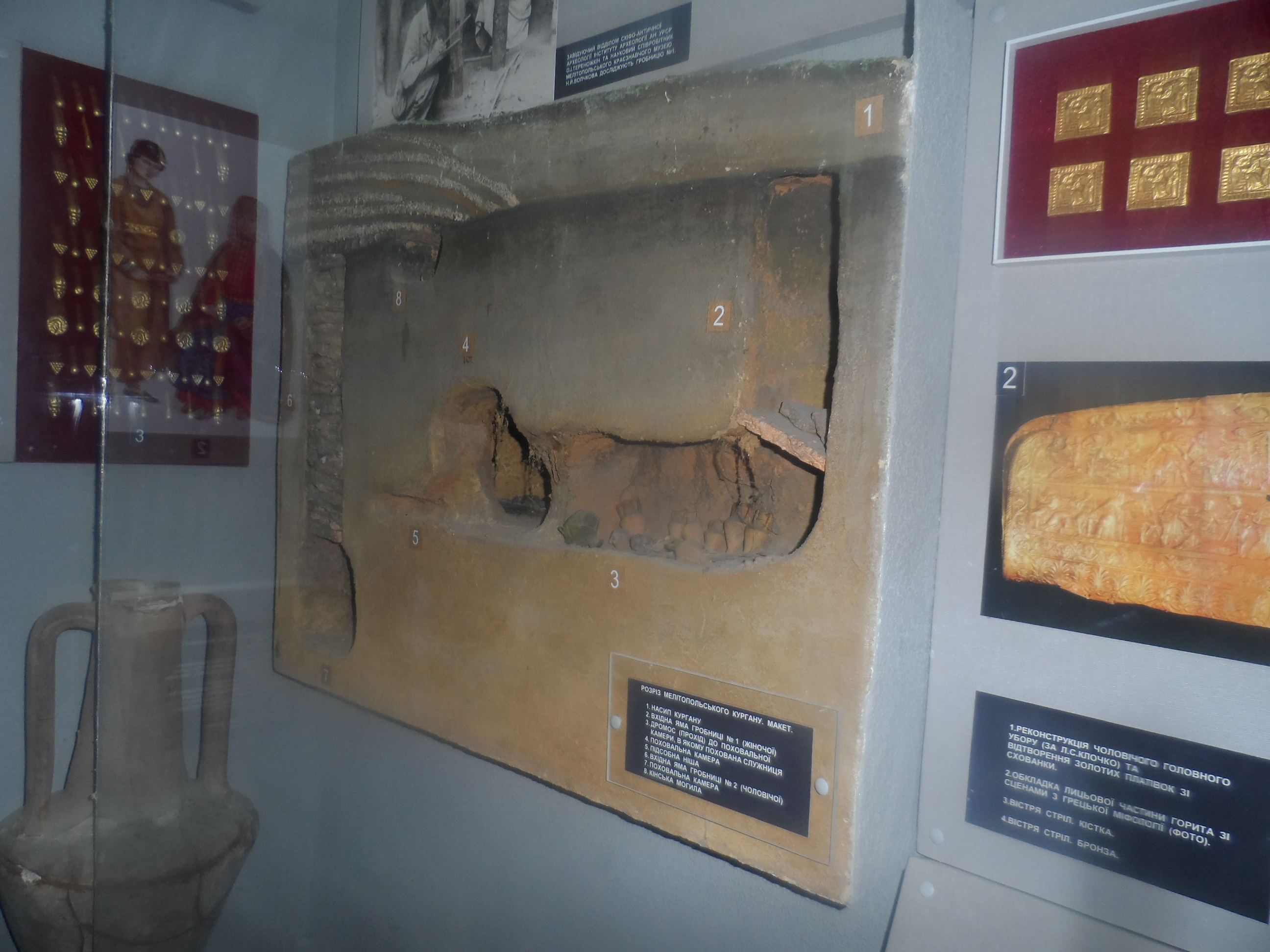
Collection of Scythian displays of the 4th century BCE.

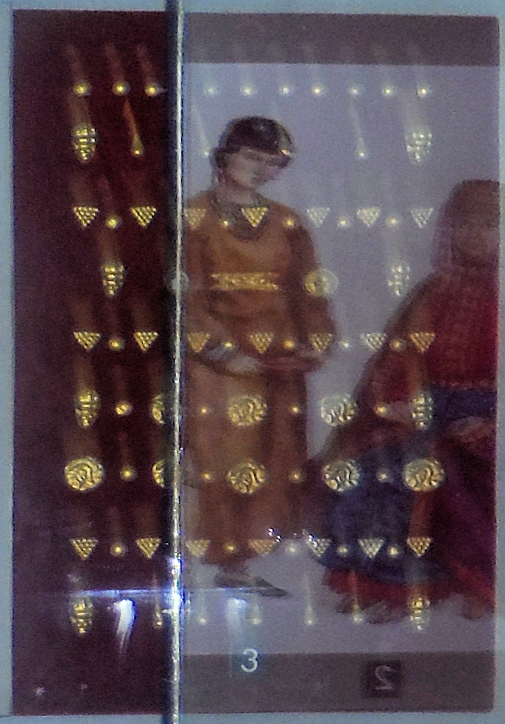
Gold objects

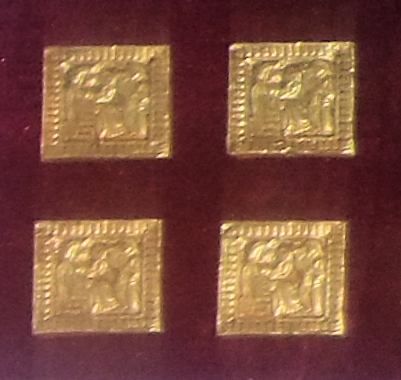
Gold plates

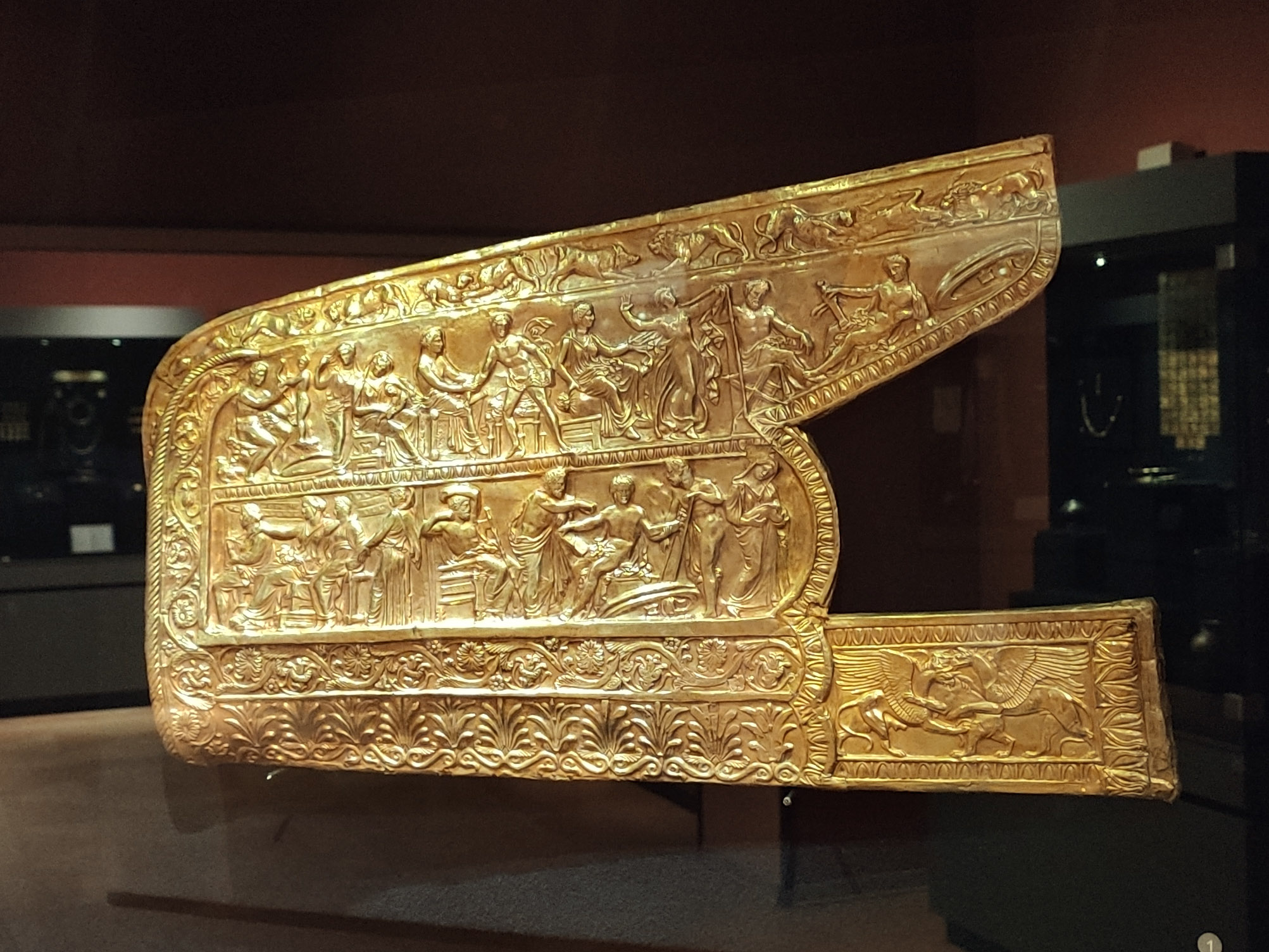
Scythian golden gorytos (4th century BCE.)

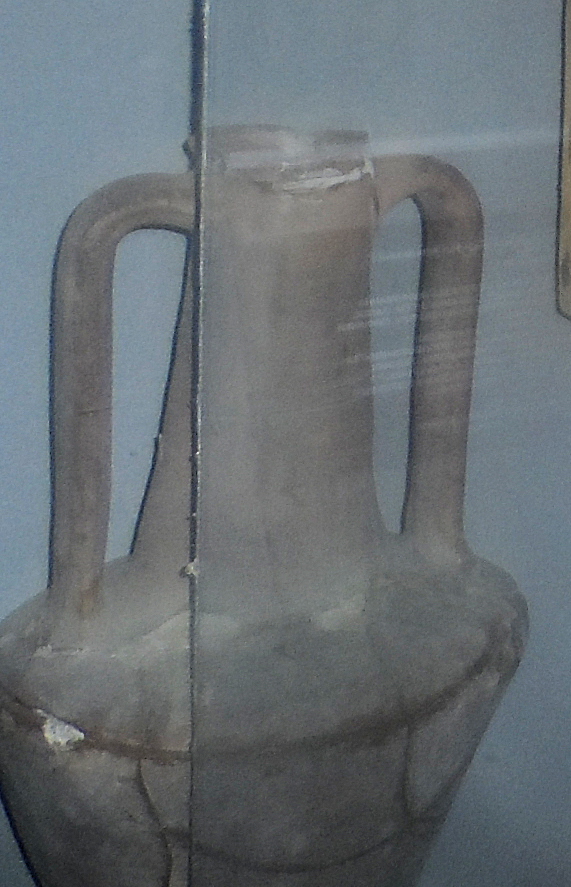
Ancient Greek Amphora
