= Tyshler =

Tyshler is a surname. Notable people with the surname include:

- Alexander Tyshler (1898–1980), Russian artist
- David Tyshler (1927–2014), Russian sabreur
