= Melitopol kurgan =

Coordinates: 46.867010°N 35.353108°E

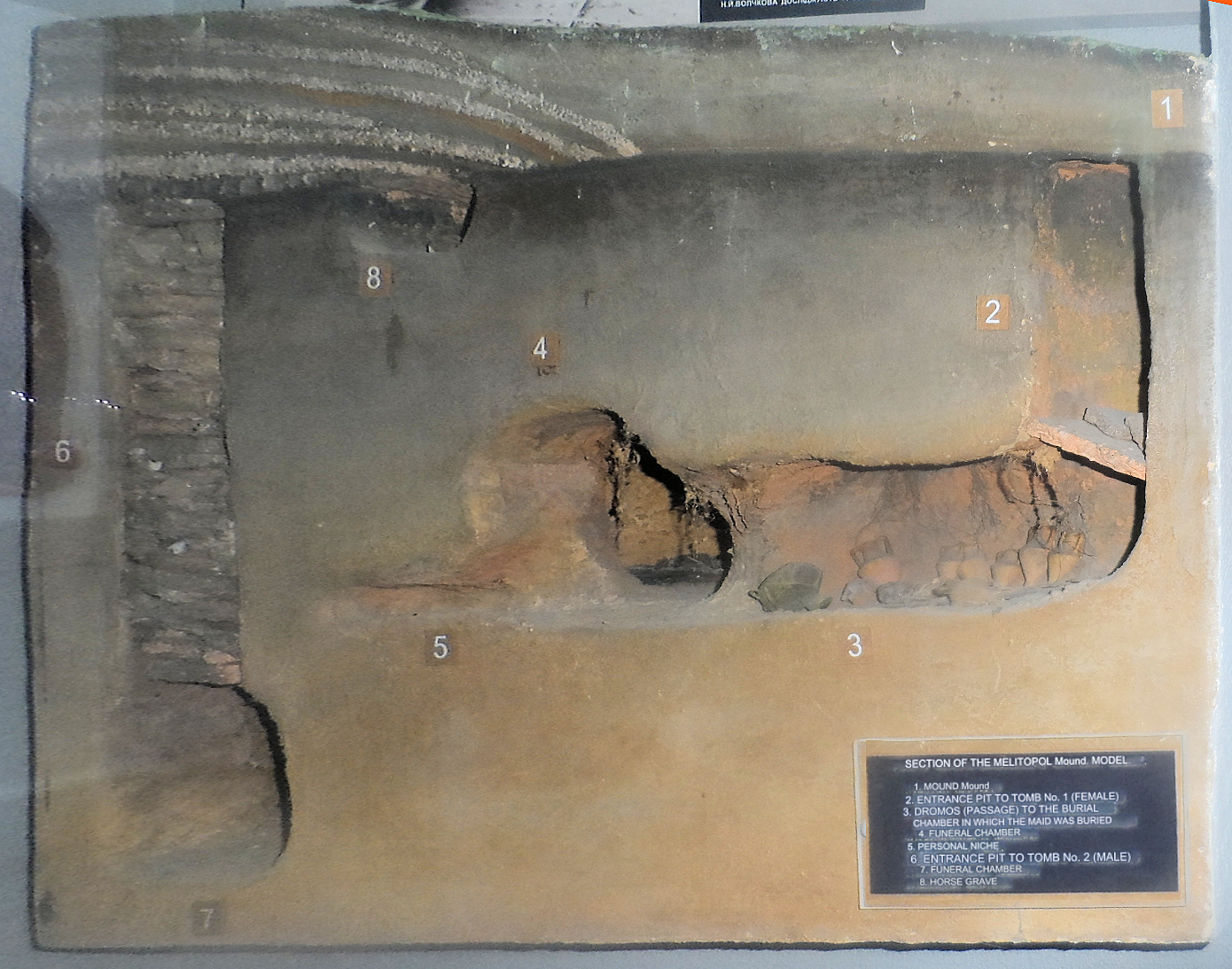
Model of the excavation of the Melitopol kurgan. Melitopol Museum of Local History

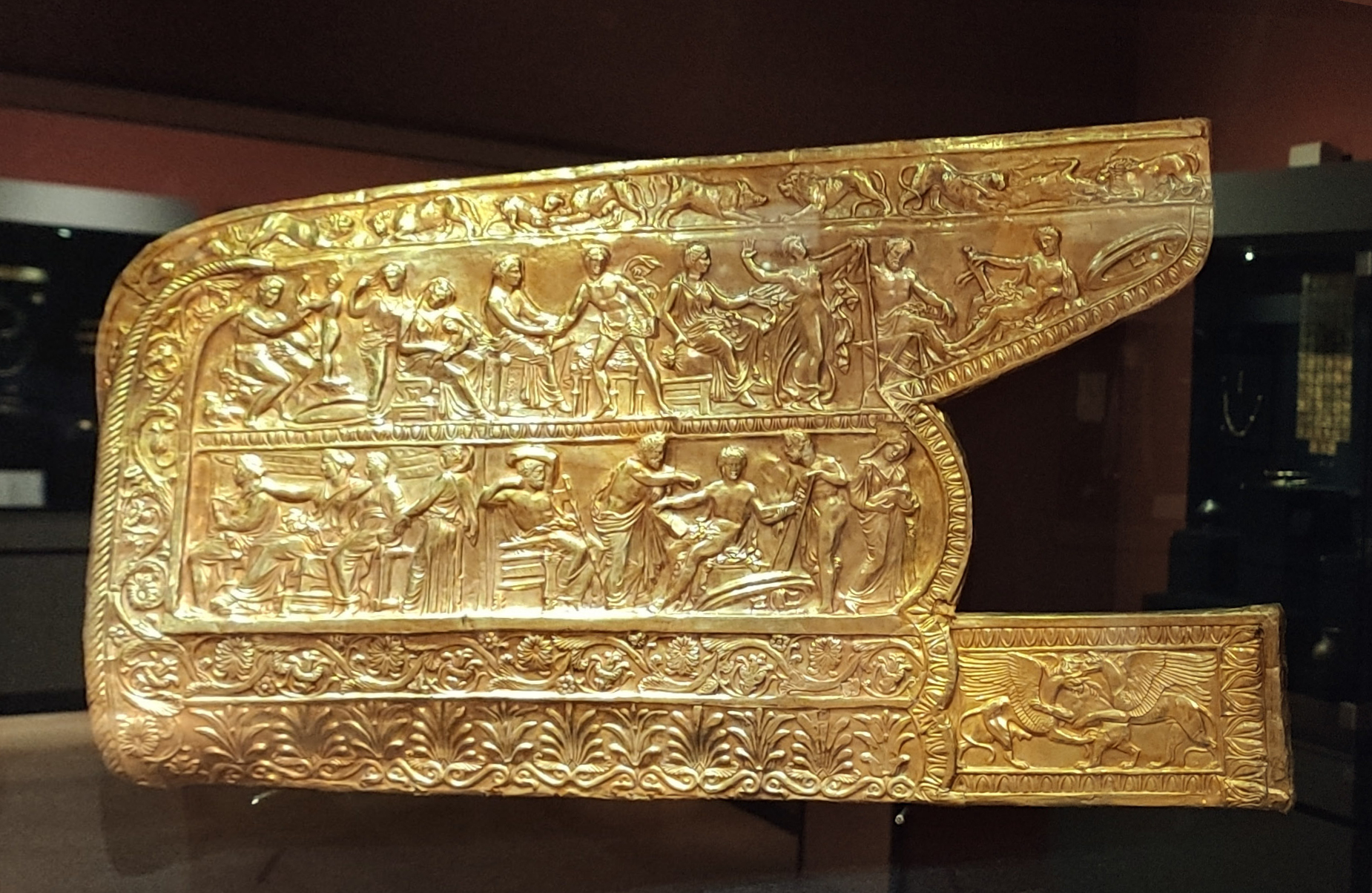
Scythian golden gorytos, 4th century BCE. Treasury of the National Museum of the History of Ukraine

The Melitopol kurgan (Ukrainian: Мелітопольський курган; Russian: Мелитопольский курган, romanized: Melitopolsky kurgan) was a Scythian kurgan of the 4th century BCE (340–320 BCE), in the city of Melitopol, on Skifska Street (formerly Pershotravneva Street), near the railway station. The kurgan had been partially looted before excavation. It was excavated in 1954 in a rescue operation before a real estate project. It was excavated first by employees of the Melitopol Museum of Local History, then by an expedition of the Institute of Archeology of the Academy of Sciences of the Ukrainian SSR, led by O.I. Terenozhkin.

Two burials were found: a female (northern tomb) and a male (central catacomb), accompanied by two dependants, as well as a horse grave. A robbed female and male burial accompanied by two horses, buried separately, was found in the barrow. The central burial is a woman's, arranged in a large catacomb 7 metres (23 ft) deep. It was accompanied by the burial of a maid in which bronzes were found, including gold-plated earrings, a necklace of glass beads, iron bracelets, the remains of a spindle and a black lacquer vessel.

The "landlady" — an elderly woman — had a headdress, clothes and shoes richly decorated with gold plaques, strings and beads. In addition, 11 Greek amphorae, a bronze cauldron with ram bones, the remains of a funeral cart with a yoke, a red-figured black-lacquer, silver and bronze dishes, wooden boxes with necklaces of earthenware and glass beads, farewell food, iron awls and many different gold ornaments were found.

For the man, the burial was arranged in a catacomb with a depth of 13.5 metres (44 ft). It was accompanied by the burial of a 7–8-year-old child. Fragments of an iron shell, arrowheads, fragments of gold jewelry, an iron awl and animal and human bones were found in the catacomb. A bronze combat belt was found in a hiding place, unnoticed by the robbers. Other finds included a portupeia necklace decorated with 50 gold plates, as well as a repoussé gold-coated gorytos with scenes from the myth of Achilles and 70 arrowheads. The covering of the gorytos is similar to that found in Chortomlyk, Ilyinetskyi and the eighth Pyatibratnyi mounds. It is located in the Treasury of the National Museum of the History of Ukraine in Kyiv. Other artifacts from the kurgan were kept at the Melitopol Museum of Local History but were looted during the 2022 Russian invasion of Ukraine. According to scientists' calculations, the total weight of the gold objects found during the excavations of the Melitopol barrow amounted to 2 kg (4.4 lb).

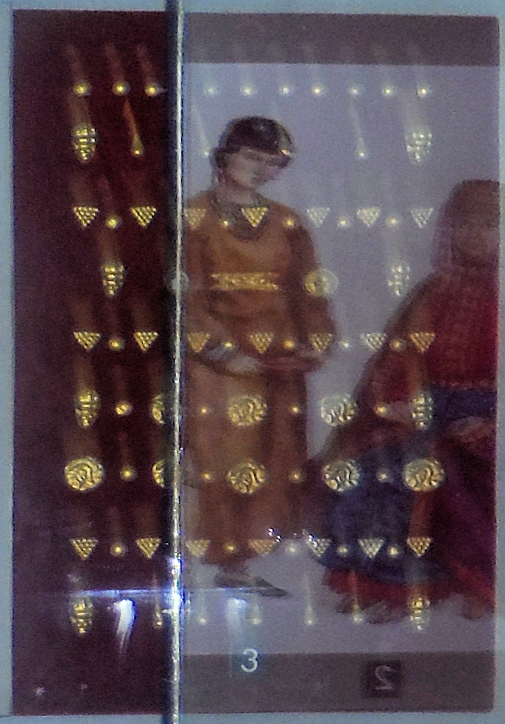
Gold objects

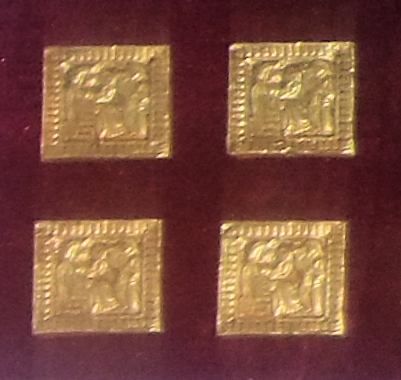
Gold plates

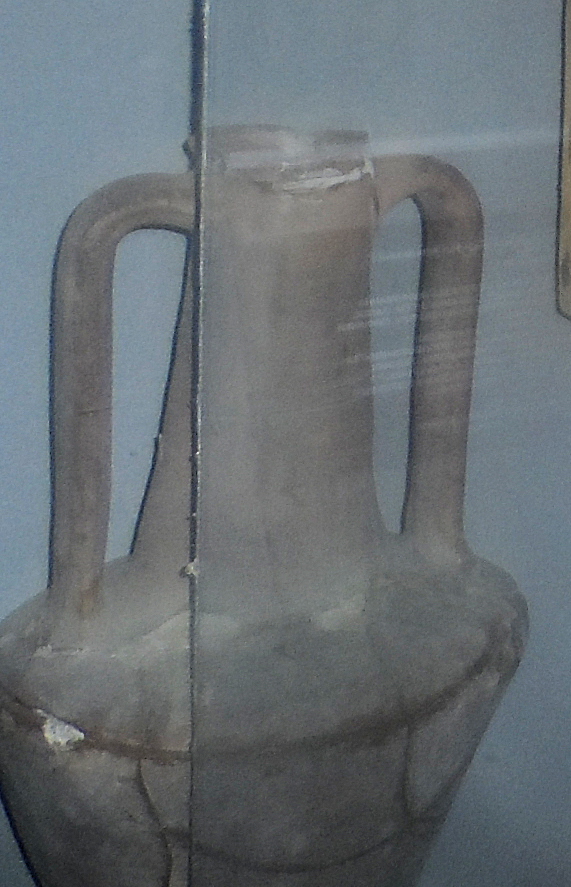
Greek amphora
