= Lyrical Cycle =

Series of paintings by Alexander Tyshler

The Lyrical Cycle or Lyrical Suite is a series of five oil-on-canvas paintings by Russian artist Alexander Tyshler, all produced in 1928.

== History ==
In 1928, Tyshler used the image of a wicker basket as the central motif for his set design for a production of Lope de Vega's The Sheep's Well by the Belarusian State Jewish Theater in Minsk, the basket's texture evoked the laconic architecture of the Spanish village where the play was set. He produced the Cycle the same year, again centered on a wicker basket, this time huge in dimensions and mysterious in purpose. In the different works, it is filled with pigeons, men, horses and donkeys. The second work shows a long-legged girl in a hat standing next to the basket, which is divided into three horizontal tiers, occupied from top to bottom by two donkeys, two male heads and doves. He also used the wicker basket motif in his 'Crimea Cycle' of watercolors, which were exhibited alongside the Lyrical Cycle at the fourth OCT exhibition in April 1928, where they were fiercely criticised.

== List ==
Number	Museum	City	Country	Size (cm)
1	State Tretyakov Gallery	Moscow	Russia	61 × 70,5
2	Pushkin Museum	Moscow	Russia	73 × 55
3	Now lost	n/a	n/a	n/a
4	Museum Ludwig	Cologne	Germany	53 × 72
5	Museum of Avant-Garde Mastery	Moscow	Russia	73 × 55
