= Alexander Tyshler =

Ukrainian Soviet painter and stage designer (1898–1980)

- Олександр Тишлер; Александр Тышлер
- Born: Олександр Григорович Тишлер; Александр Григорьевич Тышлер; Alexander Grigoryevich Tyshler; 26 July [O.S. 14 July] 1898; Melitopol, Melitopolsky Uyezd, Taurida Governorate, Russian Empire
- Died: 23 June 1980 (aged 81); Moscow, Russian SFSR, USSR
- Resting place: Kuntsevo Cemetery; 55°42′28″N 37°25′00″E
- Other name: Dzhin-Dzhikh-Shvil’
- Education: Kyiv Art School, 1917
- Occupations: Painter; stage designer; graphic designer; sculptor
- Spouse: Anastasia Grozdova (m. 1920)

Alexander Grigoryevich Tyshler (Note: Alternatively spelt Aleksandr Tischler and Aleksandr Tysler.) (Ukrainian: Олександр Григорович Тишлер; Russian: Александр Григорьевич Тышлер; 26 July [O.S. 14 July] 1898 – 23 June 1980), also known as Dzhin-Dzhikh-Shvil’, was a Russian and Soviet painter, stage designer, graphic designer and sculptor.

== Early life ==
Tyshler was born on 26 July [O.S. 14 July] 1898 in Melitopol, Melitopolsky Uyezd (now Zaporizhzhia Oblast, Ukraine) to Jewish family. His father, Grigory Tyshler, was a joiner. In 1912, Tyshler was accepted in Kyiv Art School, which he graduated from in 1917. Soon afterwards, the Russian Civil War started, and he was unable to travel back to Melitopol. Tyshler stayed in Kiev and started to visit the workshop of Aleksandra Ekster which was also the place heavily visited by the intellectual elite of the city. In 1919, he signed up for the Red Army, and in 1920 he returned to Melitopol.

== Career ==
In 1921, Tyshler moved to Moscow. In Moscow, Tyshler got close to futurist circles. He worked in painting and graphics, in particular, as a book illustrator. In this period, he was mostly interested in abstract compositions showing details of some mechanical equipment. On the other hand, the graphics was mainly figurative and, in particular, showed some themes related to the Civil War, as well as landscapes of Crimea. Starting from 1926, when Tyshler was invited to design a stage for a play in BelGOSET, the state Jewish theater in Minsk, he also started to work as a stage designer. His second stage design was for Fuenteovejuna by Lope de Vega.

He was subsequently invited to the State Jewish Theater in Kharkiv, and, in the 1930s, to Romen Theatre in Moscow. Tyshler worked with Romen Theatre until 1940 and made the stage design for most of their performances of that period. In the 1930s, he also produced many paintings on topics associated with the Russian Revolution and Civil war, as well as related to the topics of his stage design, such as a large cyclus on Romani life. Tyshler's paintings before 1936 are considered the early period of his art.

Tyshler was awarded the People's Artist of the Uzbek SSR in 1943.

Tyshler is buried at Kuntsevo Cemetery.

== Legacy ==
A notable set of his works is the 1928 Lyrical Cycle, whilst some other works by Tyshler are held in the collection of the Melitopol Museum of Local History.

== Personal life ==
In 1920, Tyshler married Anastasia Grozdova.
