= Melitopolsky Uyezd =

Uyezd in Taurida Governorate, Russian Empire

- Uezd
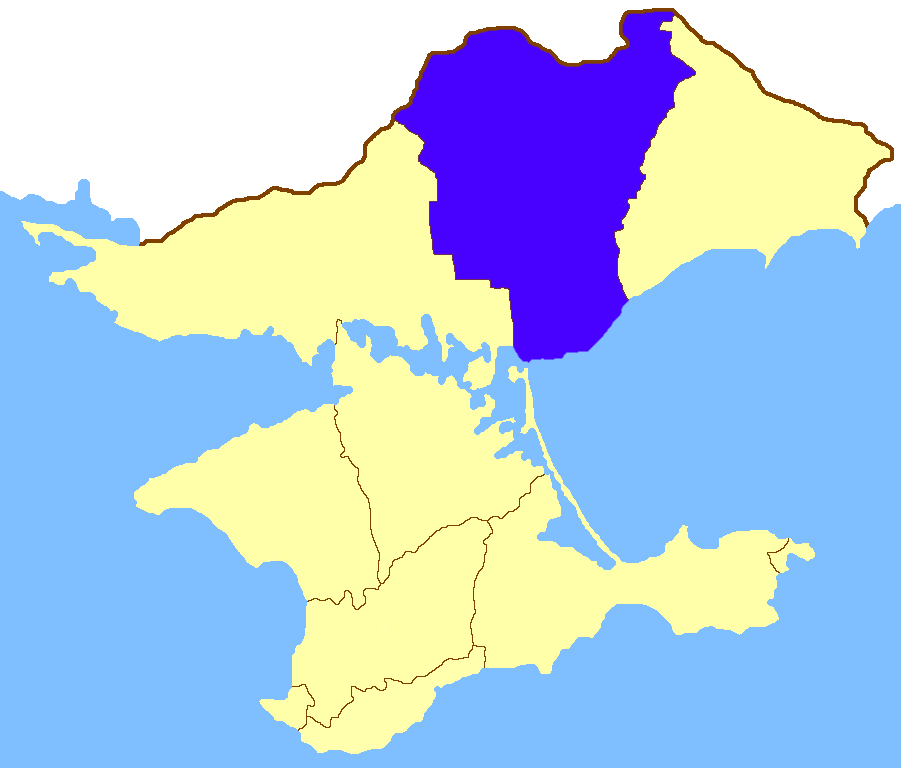
- Location in the Volhynian Governorate
- Country: Russian Empire
- Governorate: Taurida
- Established: 1842
- Abolished: 1918
- Capital: Melitopol

Population (1897)
  - Total: 384,239

Melitopolsky Uyezd (Russian: Мелитопольский уезд; Ukrainian: Мелітопольський повіт, romanized: Melitopolskyi povit) was one of the subdivisions of the Taurida Governorate of the Russian Empire. It was situated in the northern part of the governorate. Its administrative centre was Melitopol.

== Demographics ==
At the time of the Russian Empire Census of 1897, Melitopolsky Uyezd had a population of 384,239. Of these, 54.9% spoke Ukrainian, 32.8% Russian, 5.2% German, 4.2% Yiddish, 0.9% Belarusian, 0.6% Polish, 0.5% Bulgarian, 0.3% Crimean Tatar, 0.2% Czech, 0.1% Armenian, 0.1% Greek and 0.1% Romani as their native language.
