= Gorytos =

Ancient leather bow-case

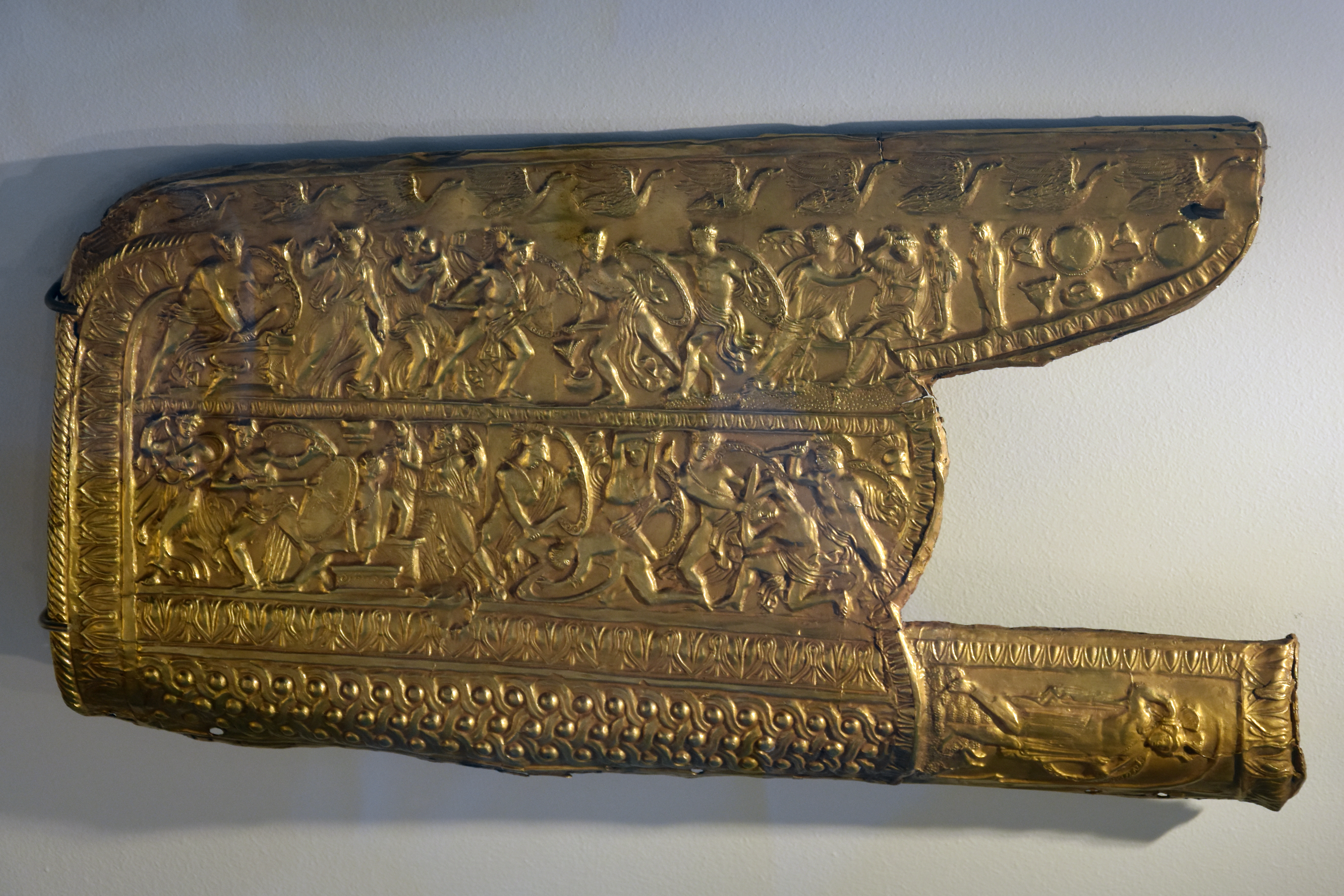
A gold-plated plaque intended to be attached to a gorytos, from tomb of Philip II of Macedon, Vergina, Greece.

A gorytos (Ancient Greek: γωρυτός, pl. γωρυτοί, Latin: gorytus) is a type of leather bow-case for a short composite bow used by the Scythians in classical antiquity. They are a combination of bow case and quiver in one, and are worn on the archer's left hip with the opening tilted rearward.

Many gorytoi were highly decorated. Elaborate plaques intended to be attached to gorytai been found in Macedonian tombs, such as the so-called "Tomb of Philip" in Vergina of the 2nd half of the 4th century BCE. They were also used by the Persians. Indo-Greeks adopted the composite bow and the gorytos as part of their mounted archery equipment from around 100 BCE, as can be seen on their coins.

In at least one surviving specimen, an analysis determined that some components were made of human skin.

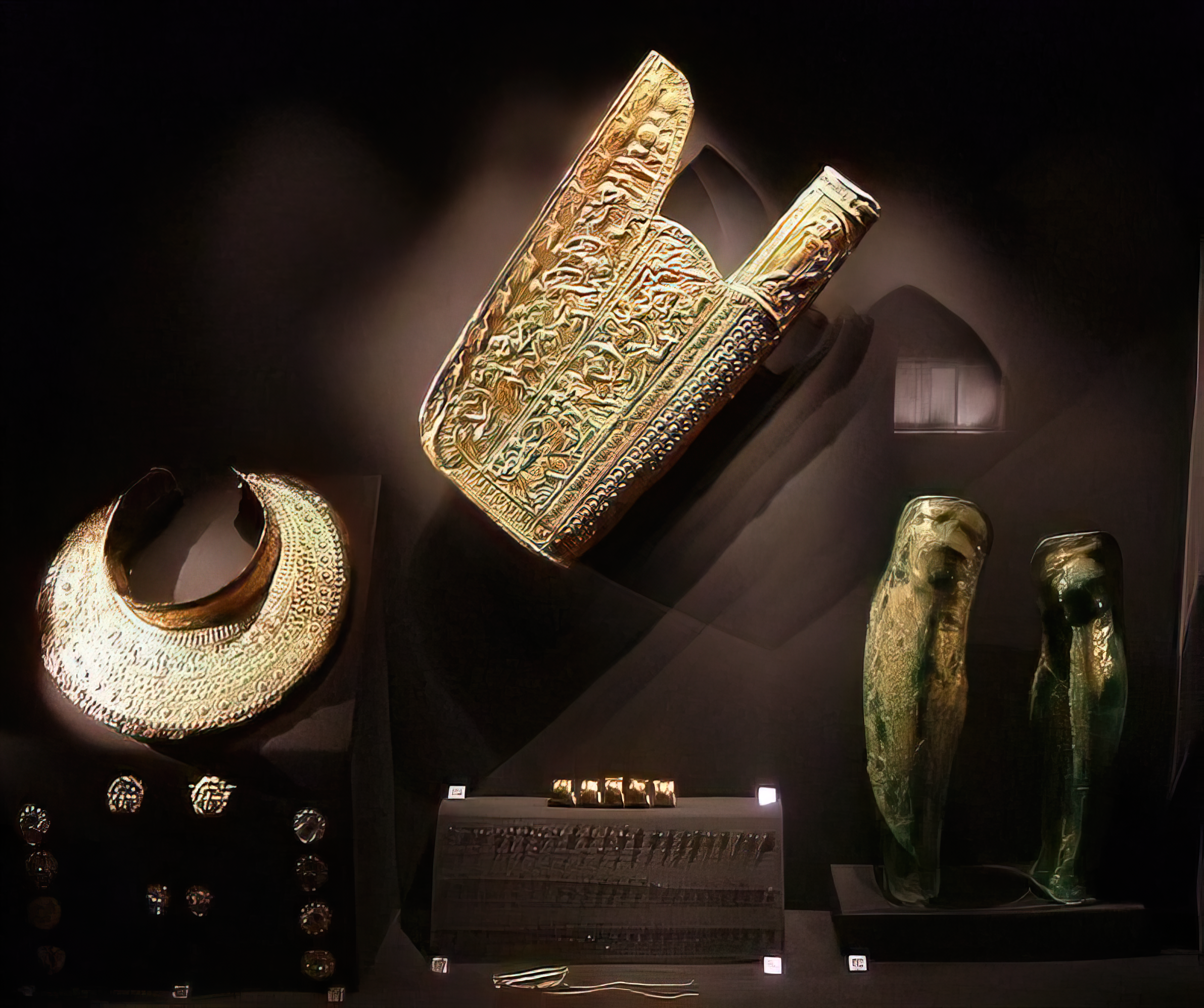
The gold quiver, shin-guards and neck armor of female in unlooted 4th Century BCE tomb of Philip II of Macedon, Vergina, Greece.

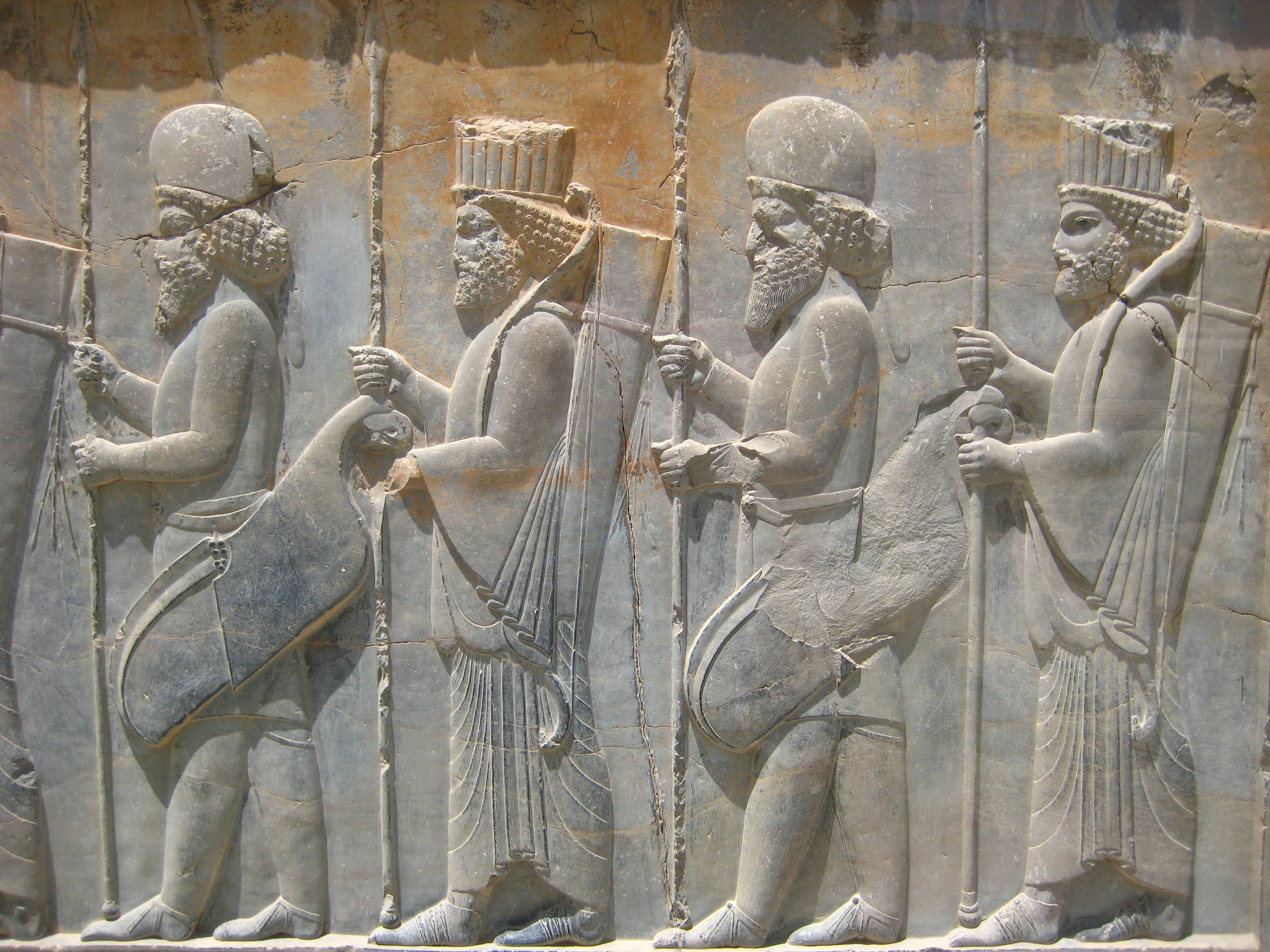
Relief of Achaemenid warriors at Persepolis. The Median ones are carrying gorytoi.
