= History of the Scythians =

The history of the Scythians—an ancient Eastern Iranic equestrian nomadic people—spans the period from the emergence of early steppe nomadism in the early 1st millennium BCE to the Migration Period in the mid-1st millennium CE. This history unfolds across time and space in Central Asia and Siberia, the Caucasus, ancient West Asia (that is the Ancient Near East) and the Pontic Steppe.

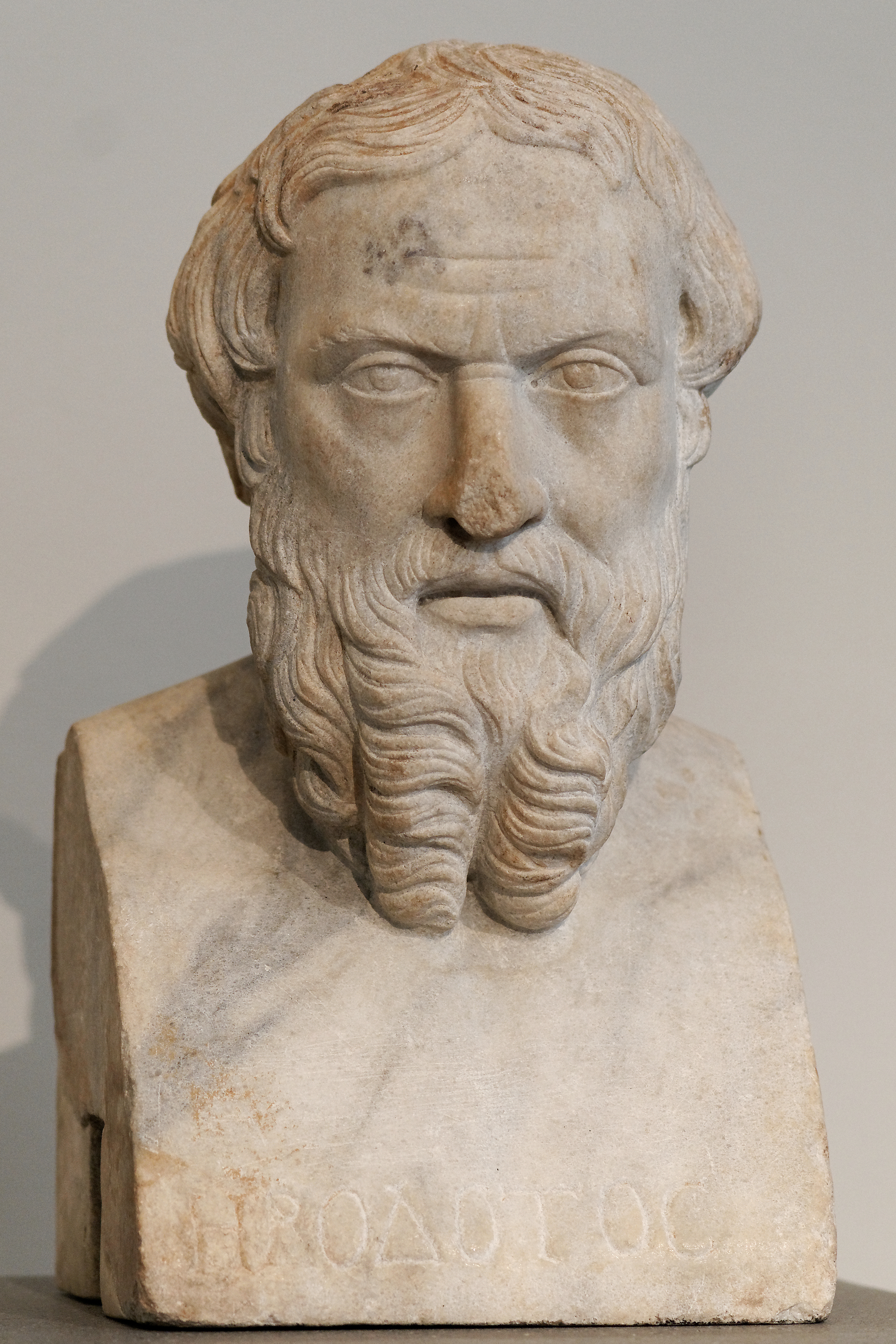
The 5th-century BCE Greek historian Herodotus of Halicarnassus produced the most important literary source on the origins of the Scythians.

Two main sources provide information on the historical Scythians:

- Akkadian cuneiform texts from Mesopotamia which deal with early Scythian history from the 7th century BCE,
- and Graeco-Roman sources which cover all of Scythian history, most prominently those written by Herodotus of Halicarnassus; the Greco-Roman sources are less reliable because the information they contain is mixed with folk tales and learnt constructs of historians.

== Pre-Scythian period ==
The arrival of the Scythians in Europe was part of the larger process of westward movement of Central Asian Iranic nomads toward Southeast and Central Europe that lasted from the 1st millennium BCE to the 1st millennium CE, in which other Iranic nomads such as the Cimmerians, Sauromatians, and Sarmatians also participated.

=== Beginning of steppe nomadism ===
True nomadic pastoralism emerged at the beginning of the first millennium BCE due to climatic changes that made the steppe environment of Central Asia and Siberia colder and more arid than before. The decline in solar activity during the 9th century BCE turned the arid, inhospitable desert of south-central Siberia into lush, resource-rich grassland capable of supporting massive herds of grazing animals. These changes transformed the sedentary Bronze Age farmers, who relied on a mixed economy, into nomadic herders. Consequently, by the 9th century BCE, all settlements of the sedentary Bronze Age populations in the steppe had disappeared, thereby fostering population mobility and the formation of warrior units needed to protect herds and occupy new territories.

These climatic conditions, in turn, prompted nomadic groups to become transhumant herders, constantly moving their herds from one pasture to another across the steppe, and to seek better grazing lands to the west, in Ciscaucasia and the forest-steppe regions of Western Eurasia.

=== The Chernogorovka-Novocherkassk complex ===
The first wave of nomadic populations who originated in the parts of Central Asia corresponding to eastern Kazakhstan or the Altai-Sayan region, had, beginning in the 10th century BCE and lasting until the 9th to 8th centuries BCE, migrated westward into the Pontic-Caspian and Pannonian Steppe regions, where they formed new tribal confederations constituting the Chernogorovka-Novocherkassk complex, among whom were the Agathyrsi in the Pontic Steppe, as well as the Cimmerians in the Caspian Steppe, and possibly the Sigynnae in the Pannonian Steppe. The archaeological and historical records regarding these migrations are however scarce, and permit only a very broad outline of this complex development to be sketched.

The Chernogorovka-Novocherkassk complex developed natively in the North Pontic region during the 9th to mid-7th centuries BCE from elements that had arrived earlier from Central Asia; thus it exhibited similarities with the other early nomadic cultures of the Eurasian steppe and forest steppe that existed before the 7th century BCE, such as the Aržan culture, so that these pre-Scythian early nomadic cultures were part of a unified Aržan-Chernogorovka cultural layer originating from Central Asia.

== Proto-Scythian period ==
Aržan kurgan (8-7th century BCE)
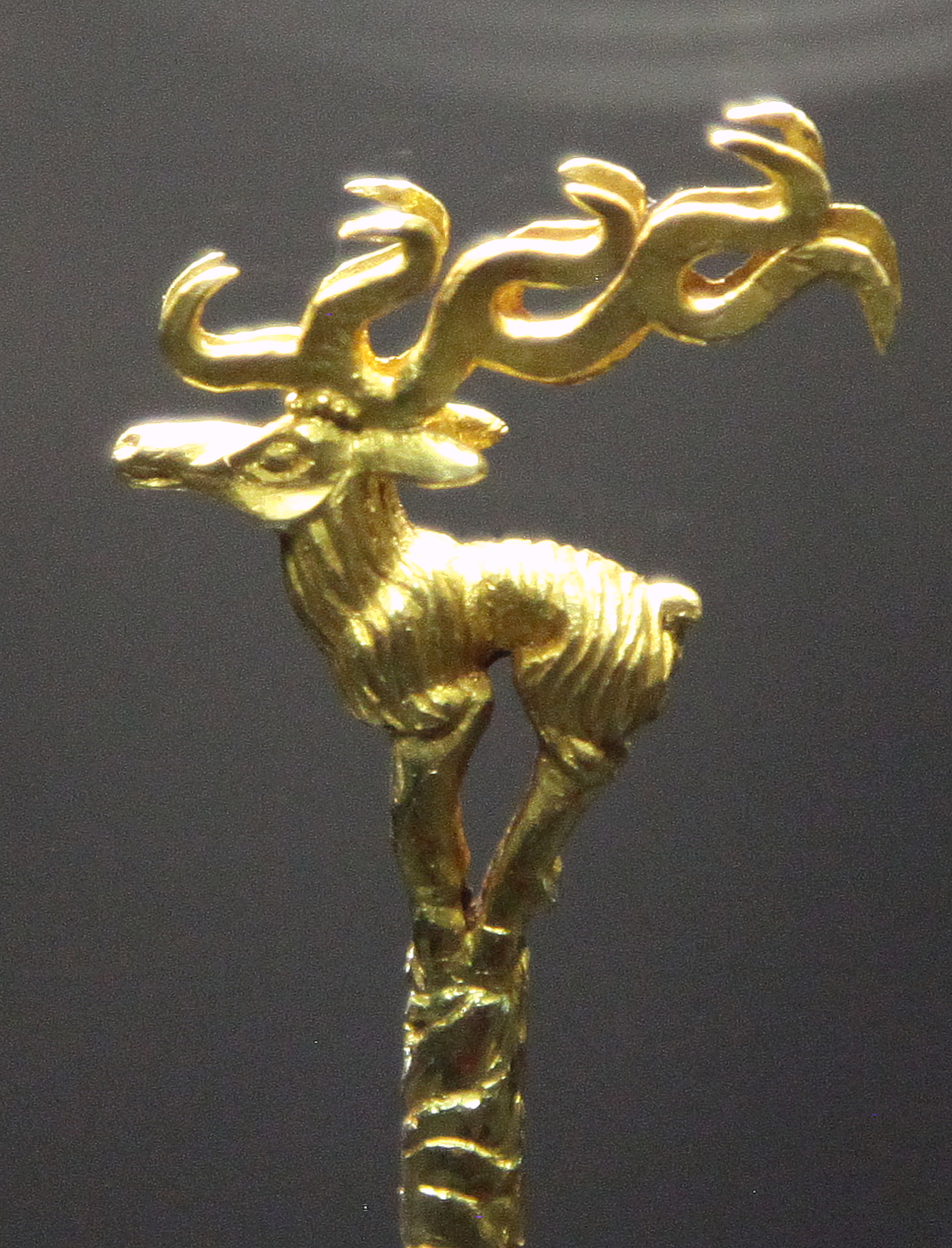
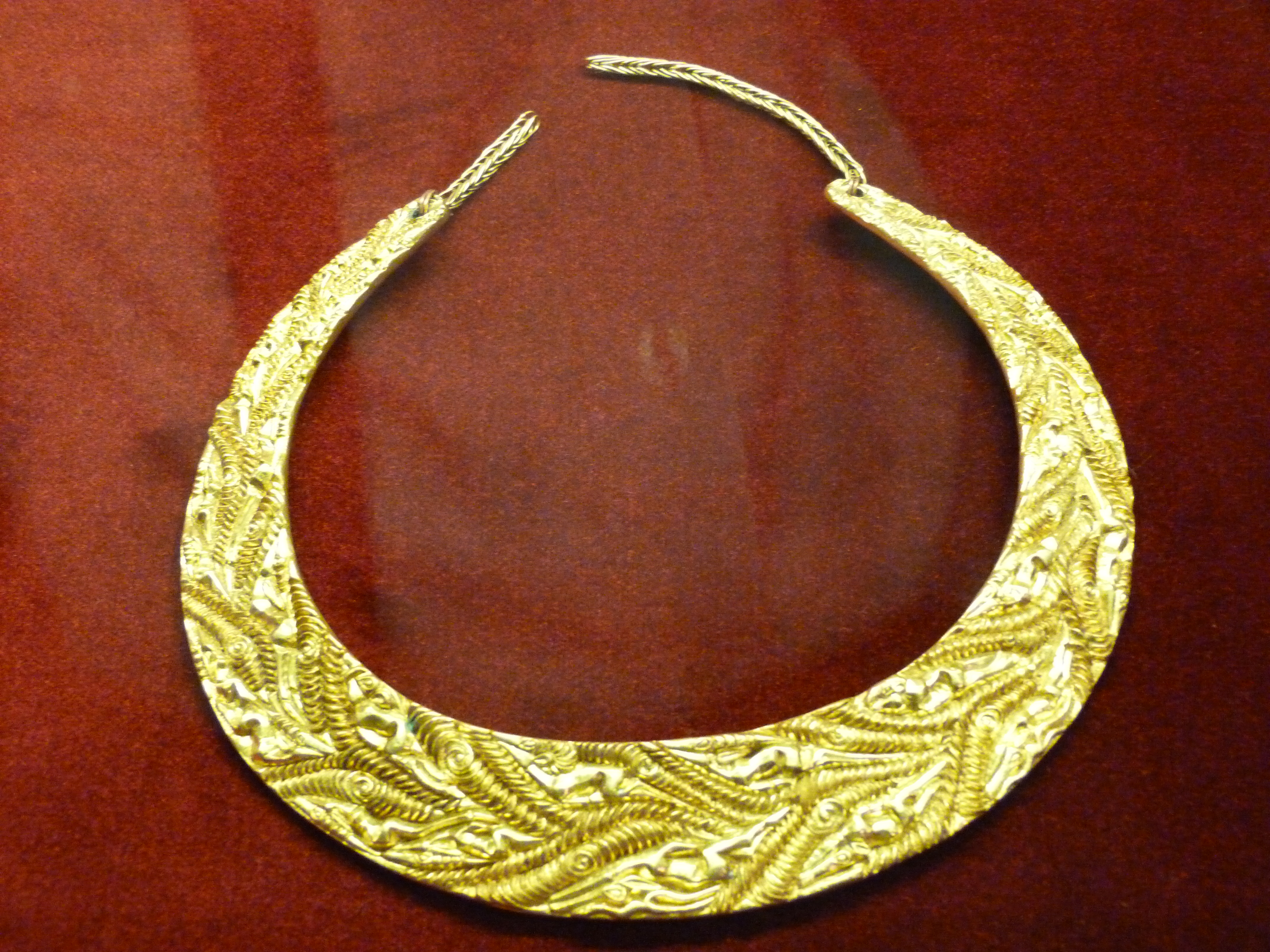
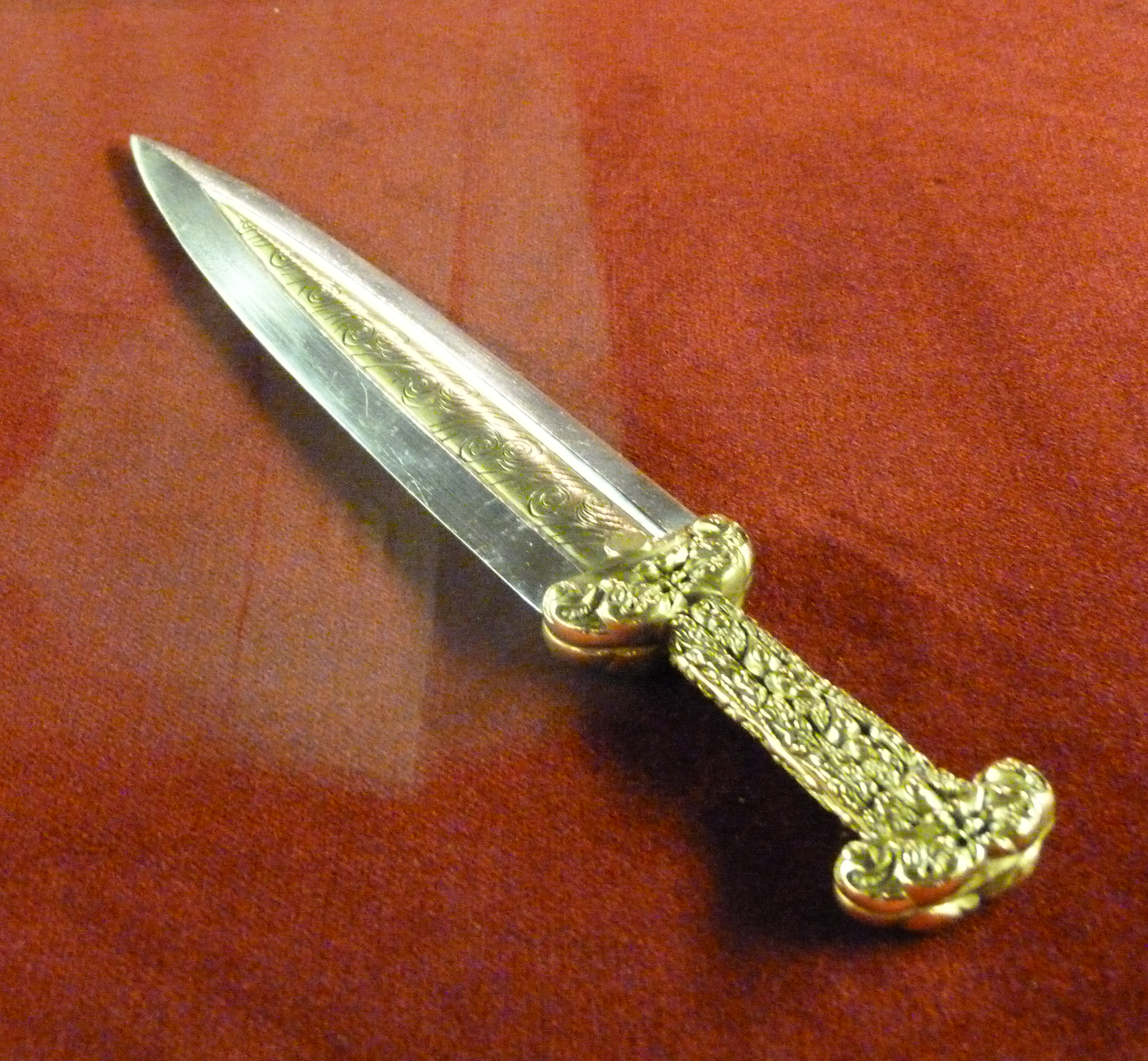
Some of the earliest Scythian artefacts in Animal style, Aržan kurgan, Southern Siberia, dated to 8-7th century BCE.

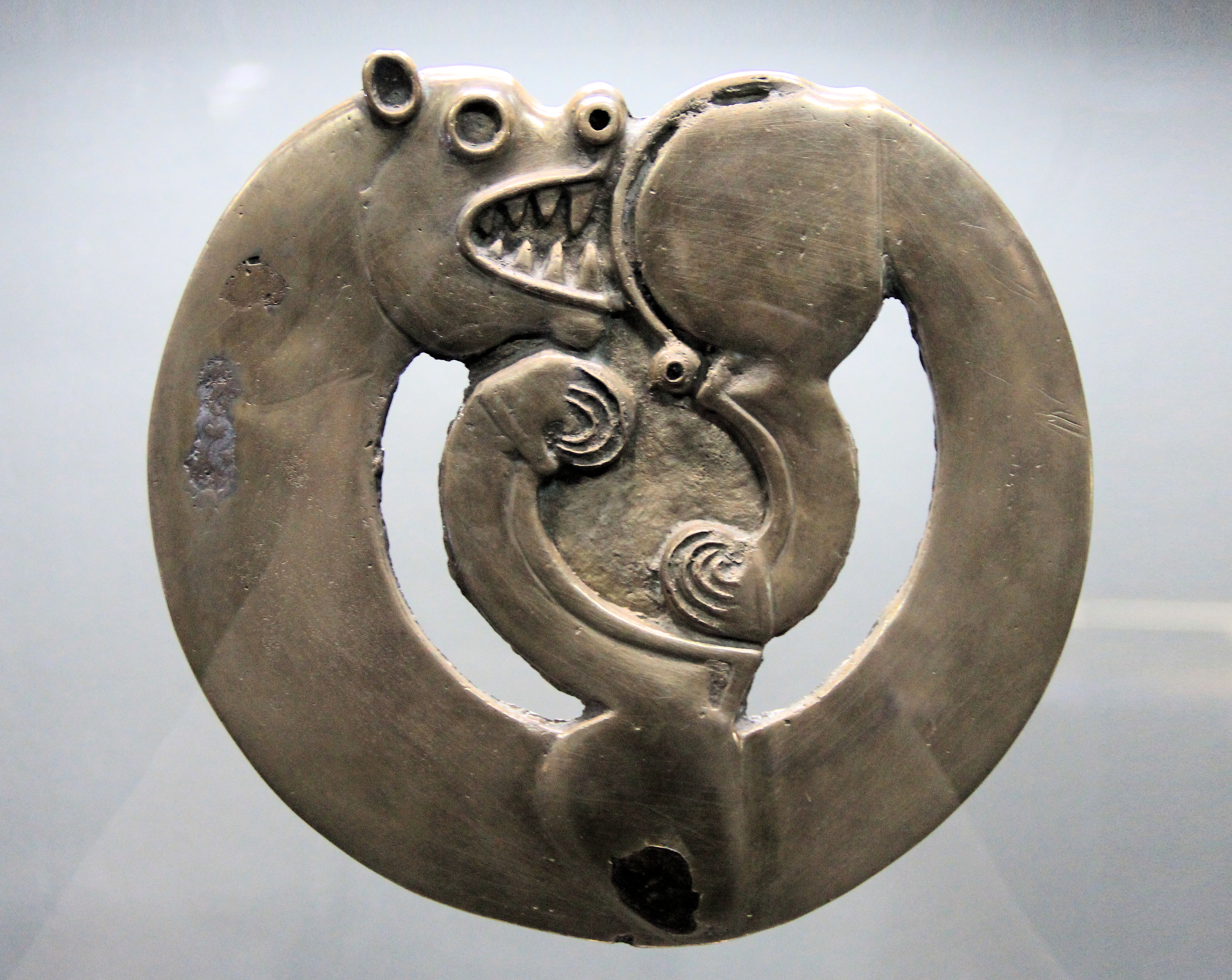
Curled-up feline animal from Aržan-1, circa 800 BCE.

Like the nomads of the Chernogorovka-Novocherkassk complex, the Scythians originated, along with the Early Sakas, in Central Asia and Siberia in the steppes corresponding to either present-day eastern Kazakhstan or the Altai-Sayan region, as attested by the continuity of Scythian burial rites and weaponry types with the Karasuk culture, as well as by the origin of the typically Scythian Animal Style art in the Mongol-Siberian region.

Therefore the Scythians and the nomads of the Chernogorovka-Novocherkassk complex were closely related populations sharing a common origin, culture and language, and the earliest Scythians were thus part of a common Aržan-Chernogorovka cultural layer originating from Central Asia, with the early Scythian culture being materially indistinguishable from the Chernogorovka-Novocherkassk complex.

Going further back, these various steppe nomads had shared a common Iranic Central Asian origin with the other Iranic peoples such as the Medes, Persians, Parthians and Sogdians. These various Iranic peoples still shared significant commonalities in language and culture, for instance common myths as well as dress and ornament styles, until at least the 5th century BCE.

The Scythians were already acquainted with quality goldsmithing and sophisticated bronze-casting at this time, as attested by gold pieces found in the 8th century BCE Aržan-1 kurgan. Arrowheads from the 1st kurgan of the Aržan burials also suggest that the typical "Scythian-type" socketed arrows made of copper alloy might have originated during this period.

=== Migration out of Central Asia ===
The second wave of Iranic nomads corresponds to the early Scythians' arrival on the Caucasian Steppe, starting in the 9th century BCE, when they were expelled from Central Asia by either the Massagetae, a powerful nomadic Iranic tribe closely related to them, or by another Central Asian people called the Issedones, forcing the early Scythians to the west, across the Araxes river and into the Caspian and Ciscaucasian Steppes.

This western migration of the early Scythians lasted through the mid-8th century BCE and archaeologically corresponds to the westward movement of a population originating from Tuva, in southern Siberia, in the late 9th century BCE and arriving in the 8th to 7th centuries BCE in Europe, especially Ciscaucasia, which it reached some time between c. 750 and c. 700 BCE, thus following the same general migration path as the first wave of Iranic nomads of the Chernogorovka-Novocherkassk complex.

==== Displacement of the Cimmerians ====
The Scythians' westward migration brought them to the Caspian Steppe, in the lands of the Cimmerians, who had themselves originated in the first westward wave of proto-Scythian migrations of nomadic populations to arrive from Central Asia into the Pontic-Caspian Steppe regions during the 10th century BCE.

The Cimmerians at this time were leaving their homelands in the Caspian Steppe to move into West Asia: the Cimmerians might have migrated under pressure from the Scythians, although sources are lacking for any such pressure on the Cimmerians by the Scythians or of any conflict between these two peoples at this early period. Moreover, the arrival of the Scythians in West Asia about 40 years after the Cimmerians did so suggests there is no available evidence to the later Graeco-Roman account that it was under pressure from Scythians migrating into their territories that the Cimmerians crossed the Caucasus and moved south into West Asia.

The remnants of the Cimmerians in the Caspian Steppe were assimilated by the Scythians, facilitated by their similar ethnic backgrounds and lifestyles. Thus dominance of this region was transferred from the Cimmerians to the Scythians, who then settled in the Ciscaucasian Steppe where their kingdom's headquarters was, between the Araxes river to the east, the Caucasus Mountains to the south, and the Maeotian Sea to the west.

The arrival of the Scythians and their establishment in this region in the 7th century BCE corresponds to a disruption in the development of the Cimmerian peoples' Chernogorovka-Novocherkassk complex. This complex was thus replaced through a continuous process over the years c. 750 to c. 600 BCE in southern Europe by the early Scythian culture, which nevertheless still showed links to the Chernogorovka-Novocherkassk complex. Some aspects of Scythian culture, such as elements of funerary rituals, ceramics, horse gear, and some weapon types, also showed links to the older Timber Grave culture that had existed in the north Pontic region in the Bronze Age.

== Early (or Archaic) Scythian period ==
=== Ciscaucasian kingdom ===
After their initial westwards migrations, and beginning around c. 750 BCE, the Scythians settled in the Ciscaucasian Steppe between the Araxes river to the east, the Caucasus mountains to the south, and the Maeotian Sea to the west, and were especially concentrated in the valley of the Kuban river, where their kingdom's headquarters would be until the end of the 7th century BCE: the Scythians who first arrived in Ciscaucasia did not consist of large numbers of people and they lived in a small area. During these early phases of Scythian history, Ciscaucasia was where the nomadic state and the culture of the Scythians developed, and it would remain the centre of the Scythian kingdom until around c. 600 BCE.

Several Scythian royal burials from the 7th century BCE, such as those of Krasnoye Znamya at Stavropol, Kelermesskaya, Ulsky Aul and Kostromskaya Stanitsa, date from this period and constitute evidence of a wealthy Scythian aristocracy living in Ciscaucasia at this time. These upper-class burials exhibited significant differences from commoner burials, implying the existence of important levels of social stratification among the population of the early Scythian kingdom.

In Ciscaucasia the Scythians came into contact with a heterogeneous group of agrarian Maeotian tribes, whom they subjugated and thereafter dominated by means of their mobility and military units, needed to conquer new areas and protect their herds. There was significant social differentiation between the Scythians and their native subjects, especially the Maeotians, with the Scythian ruling class being buried in lavishly equipped kurgans whilst the Maeotians were buried in poorly furnished flat cemeteries.

Since the Scythians needed agricultural and craft products from the native populations, they conquered them and established interdependent systems: the Scythians obtained surplus through collecting tribute from the populations of the native Koban and Maeotian cultures of Ciscaucasia, who provided various goods to the Scythians, such as agricultural products, and crafted goods such as clay and bronze vessels, various weapons, bridles and horse harness equipment; the Maeotian craftsmen especially made large wide-necked pots, jugs, mugs and small basins for Scythian customers.

These interactions between the Scythians and Maeotians widened through the 8th to 7th centuries BCE, leading to the creation of a mixed culture, and some of the local tribes were assimilated into the Scythians, thereby contributing to the growth of the Scythian population. Significant exchanges between the Scythians and the native inhabitants of the Caucasus region also occurred during this period:

- the Scythian culture adopted many elements of the native Ciscaucasian cultures, so that the interaction with the various Maeotian tribes contributed significantly to the cultural development of the Scythians;
- the Ciscaucasian peoples were in turn significantly influenced by the Scythians, so that the burials of the Koban and Colchian cultures contained Scythian-type weapons and horse equipment.

This earliest phase of Scythian culture, called "pre-Kelermes" because it pre-dates the Kelermes kurgans containing West Asian objects, was formed in the Ciscaucasian Steppe over the years c. 750 to c. 700 BCE. The early Scythian culture thus developed under the partial influence of the native Ciscaucasian cultures, and, to a lesser degree, of the civilisation of West Asia, resulting in Scythian art from Ciscaucasia displaying influences from the Koban culture. The Scythians would in particular use helmets of Ciscaucasian origin until the 6th century BCE.

=== Arrival in West Asia ===
==== Cimmerian migration into West Asia ====
During the second half of the 8th century BCE and the 7th century BCE, the equestrian steppe nomads from Ciscaucasia expanded to the south into West Asia, beginning with the Cimmerians, who did so by crossing the Caucasus Mountains through the Alagir, Darial, and Klukhor Passes, after which they eventually became active in Transcaucasia, the Iranian Plateau and Anatolia.

==== Reasons for southward nomad expansion ====
The involvement of the steppe nomads in West Asia happened in the context of the concurrent growth of the Neo-Assyrian Empire, which under its kings Sargon II and Sennacherib had expanded from its core region of the Tigris and Euphrates valleys to rule and dominate a large territory ranging from Que (Plain Cilicia) and the Central and Eastern Anatolian mountains in the north to the Syrian Desert in the south, and from the Taurus Mountains and North Syria and the coast of the Mediterranean Sea in the west to the Iranian Plateau in the east.

Surrounding the Neo-Assyrian Empire were several smaller polities:

- in Anatolia to the northwest, were the kingdoms of:
  - Phrygia, with its capital at Gordion, holding hegemony over Central and Midwest Anatolia and parts of Cilicia;
  - and Lydia;
- Babylon, conquered several times by the Assyrians, in the south;
- Egypt in the southwest;
- Elam, whose capital was Susa, in the southwest of the Iranian plateau, where they were the main power, with their ruling classes being divided into pro-Assyrian and pro-Babylonian factions;
- and to the immediate north was the powerful kingdom of Urartu (centred around Ṭušpa), which had established several installations including a system of fortresses and provincial centres over regional communities in eastern Anatolia and the northwest Iranian Plateau, and was contesting its southern borderlands with the Neo-Assyrian Empire;
- in the eastern mountains were several weaker polities:
  - Ellipi;
  - Mannai;
  - the city-states of the Medes, an Iranic people of West Asia to whom the Scythians and Cimmerians were distantly related.

Beyond the territories under direct Assyrian rule, especially on its frontiers in Anatolia and the Iranian Plateau, were local rulers who negotiated for their own interests by vacillating between the various rival great powers.

This state of permanent social disruption caused by the rivalries of the great powers of West Asia proved to be a very attractive source of opportunities and wealth for the steppe nomads; and, as the populations of the nomads of the Ciscaucasian Steppe continued to grow, their aristocrats would lead their followers southward across the Caucasus Mountains in search of adventure and plunder, in the volatile status quo then prevailing in West Asia, (not unlike the later Ossetian tradition of ritual plunder called the balc, балц), with the occasional raids eventually leading to longer expeditions, in turn leading to groups of nomads choosing to remain in West Asia in search of opportunities as mercenaries or freebooters.

Thus, the Scythians and Cimmerians became active in West Asia in the 7th century BCE, where they would vacillate between supporting either the Neo-Assyrian Empire or other local powers, and serve these as mercenaries, depending on what they considered to be in their interests. Their activities would over the course of the late-8th to late-7th centuries BCE disrupt the balance of power that had prevailed between the states of Elam, Mannai, the Neo-Assyrian Empire and Urartu on one side and the mountaineer and tribal peoples on the other, eventually leading to significant geopolitical changes in this region.

Nevertheless, a 9th or 8th century BCE kurgan from Paphlagonia belonging to a warrior, and containing typical steppe nomad equipment, suggests that nomadic warriors had already been arriving in West Asia since the 9th century BCE. Such burials imply that some small groups of steppe nomads from Ciscaucasia might already have acted as mercenaries, adventurers and settlers in West Asia, paving the way for the later large scale movement of the Cimmerians and Scythians there.

There appears to have been very little direct connection between the Cimmerians' migration into West Asia and the Scythians' later expansion there. Thus, the arrival of the Scythians in West Asia about 40 years after that of the Cimmerians contrasts with the later Graeco-Roman account that it was under pressure from the Scythians migrating into their territories, that the Cimmerians crossed the Caucasus and moved south into West Asia.

==== Scythian expansion into West Asia ====
After settling in Ciscaucasia, the Scythians followed the path of the previous 'Cimmerian' wave to expand southward from there, following the western shore of the Caspian Sea and bypassing the Caucasus Mountains to the east through the Caspian Gates—much as the Sarmatians, Alans and Huns would later invade the Arsacid Parthian and Sasanid Persian empires. With the Scythians first arriving in Transcaucasia around c. 700 BCE, they thus became active players in the West Asian milieu. This Scythian expansion into West Asia, nonetheless, never lost contact with the core Scythian kingdom on the Ciscaucasian Steppe, and was merely an extension of it, as with the concurrent westward Scythian expansion onto the Pontic Steppe.

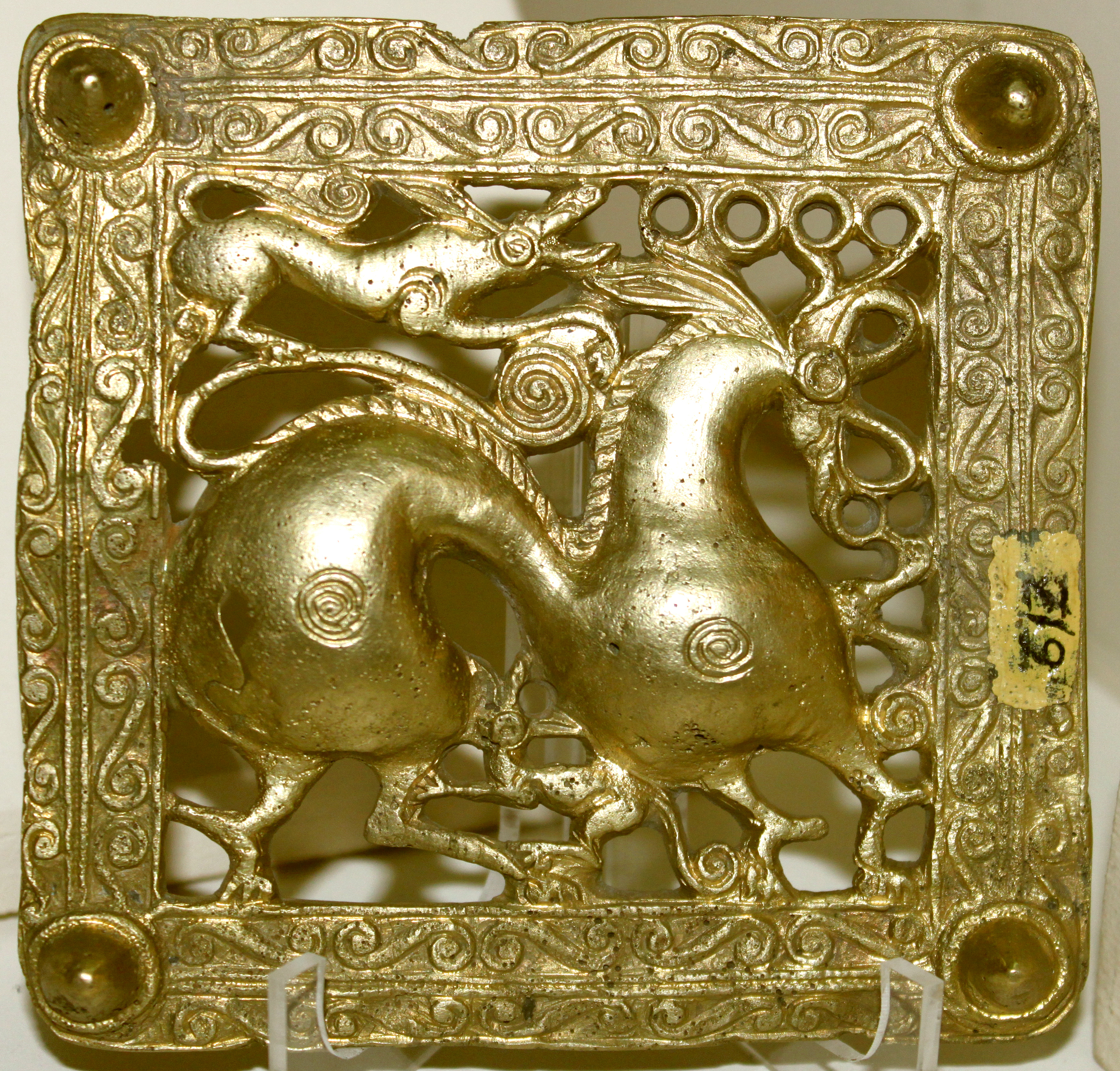
Gold Scythian belt title, Mingəçevir (ancient Scythian kingdom), Azerbaijan, 7th-4th century BCE

Having at last crossed into West Asia, the Scythians settled in eastern Transcaucasia and the northwest Iranian plateau, between the middle course of the Cyrus and Araxes rivers, before expanding into the regions corresponding to present-day Gəncə, Mingəçevir and the Muğan plain in the steppes of what is presently Azerbaijan, which became their centre of operations until c. 600 BCE. This part of Transcaucasia settled by the Scythians then became known in Akkadian sources as the "land of the Scythians" (𒆳𒅖𒆪𒍝𒀀𒀀, māt Iškuzaya) after them. The neighbours of the Scythians in Transcaucasia at this time were Urartu, Mannai, and the Medes.

This Scythian movement into Transcaucasia is archaeologically attested as an expansion of their material culture southward, as far as the northern foothills of the Caucasus Mountains, and then from Ciscaucasia farther southward along the western coast of the Caspian Sea into Transcaucasia and the Iranian Plateau.

Unlike the Cimmerians—who by then were splitting into a western group that would move into Anatolia and an eastern one migrating into the Iranian Plateau—the Scythians in West Asia remained organised within a single polity centred in Transcaucasia and the northwestern Iranian plateau.

Once the Scythians had expanded into Transcaucasia, craftsmen from this region also became their suppliers, so that both Ciscaucasian and Transcaucasian workshops were producing bronze vessels with zoomorphic handles, various types of bowls decorated with stamped and engraved signs, and cast and riveted bronze cauldrons for Scythian customers.

=== Activities in Europe ===
==== Arrival in the Pontic Steppe ====
From their base in the Ciscaucasian Steppe, the Scythians during the 8th to 7th centuries BCE conquered the Pontic and Crimean Steppes north of the Black Sea up to the Istros river, whose mouth thereafter formed the southwestern boundary of Scythian territory, while the Eastern Carpathian Mountains blocked their advance to the west, so that the Scythian kingdom's limits before its expansion into West Asia would be the Carpathian Mountains in the west and the Caucasus Mountains in the south. This initial Scythian population settling on the Pontic Steppe in the 8th and 7th centuries BCE remained small, while the bulk of the Scythian population remained on the Ciscaucasian Steppe.

==== Displacement of the Agathyrsi ====
The migration of the Scythians onto the Pontic Steppe affected the steppe and forest steppe areas of Southwest Europe, and pushed out several other populations toward more remote regions.

Among the many populations displaced by the Scythian expansion were the Agathyrsi, another nomadic Iranic people who belonged to the same migration wave and Chernogorovka-Novocherkassk complex as the Cimmerians—making the Agathyrsi the oldest of these kindred Iranic populations archaeologically known to have dominated the Pontic Steppe.

The incoming migration of the Scythians from the east pushed the Agathyrsi westward, out of the Pontic Steppe, resulting in Scythians becoming the dominant population of the Pontic Steppe over the years c. 650 to c. 600 BCE. The Agathyrsi thereafter became the immediate neighbours of the Scythians to their west, and relations between these two tribes remained hostile.

Early Scythian-type remains found in Central Europe, especially on the Thracian and Pannonian plains, correspond in part to the Agathyrsi, along with other smaller groups also displaced from the Pontic Steppe into the Carpathians region.

==== Raids into Central Europe ====
Using the Pontic Steppe as their base, from around c. 700 BCE the Scythians often raided into Central and Southeast Europe; as a consequence, weapons and horse-equipment originating from the steppes started appearing around c. 700 BCE in Central Europe.

==== Relations with the forest steppe ====
To the north of the Pontic Steppe was the East European forest steppe, divided into several separate zones by the large rivers flowing southward across it into the Black Sea. This forest steppe region was inhabited by several different native cultural groups, with the tribes farther north being outside the range of Scythian influence.

The forest steppe tribes to the south meanwhile had, since the Bronze Age, been organised into large mixed farming communities who kept close links with the Scythians and traded with them, leading to the ruling classes of these forest tribes copying Scythian burial styles. During the 7th century BCE, these forest steppe mixed farmers were coming under Scythian influence, that is their daily lives began to resemble to some extent that of the militaristic nomadic lifestyle of the Scythians. Nevertheless, many of these forest steppe cultures maintained much of their earlier local character, especially regarding commoner burial traditions, pottery, and local decorations, meaning they remained distinct from the culture of the nomadic Scythians.

Beginning in the 7th century BCE, the Scythians initiated a long period of military conflict by attempting to impose their rule over the forest steppe tribes, and in response these latter peoples built large numbers of fortified settlements to repel these attacks.

=== Presence in West Asia ===
During the 7th century BCE, the Scythians were present in both Cis- and Transcaucasia: to the south of the Caucasus Mountains, the Scythians, along with the Cimmerians, became embroiled in the developments of West Asia, and their activities would soon range from Transcaucasia to farther south in Media.

Throughout the 7th century BCE, it was from West Asia that the most important outside influences would arrive into the culture of the Scythians settled in Ciscaucasia, developing into a "post-Kelermes" Scythian culture over the years c. 700 to c. 650 BCE. The Scythian and Cimmerian movements into Anatolia and the Iranian Plateau would also act as catalysts for the adoption of Eurasian nomadic military and equestrian equipment by various West Asian states: it was during the 7th and 6th centuries BCE that "Scythian-type" socketed arrowheads and sigmoid bows ideal for use by mounted warriors, the most advanced shooting weaponry of their time, both technically and ballistically superior to native West Asian archery equipment, were adopted throughout West Asia.

Cimmerian and Scythian trading posts and settlements on the borders of the various West Asian states at this time also supplied them with goods such as animal husbandry products—not unlike the trade relations during the mediaeval period between the eastern steppe nomads and the Chinese Tang Empire.

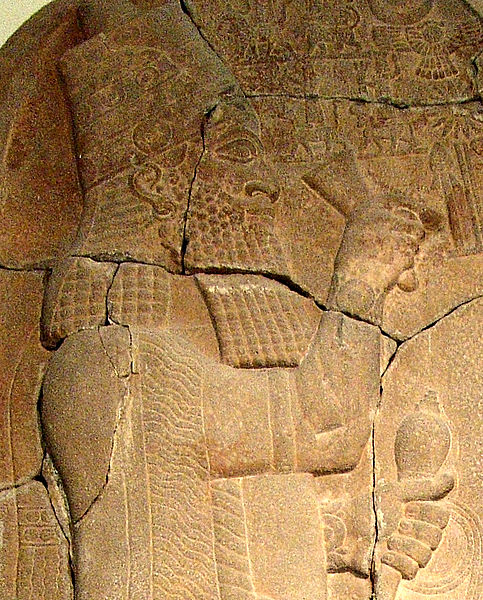
The Neo-Assyrian king Esarhaddon

With the Cimmerian victory on Urartu and Sargon II's successful campaign there, both occurring in 714 BCE, having eliminated Urartu as a threat against the Neo-Assyrian Empire, Mannai had ceased to be useful as a buffer zone for Neo-Assyrian power, while the Mannaeans began to see the Neo-Assyrian imperial demands as an unneeded burden. Therefore, the Mannaean king Aḫšeri (r. c. 675 – c. 650 BCE) welcomed the Cimmerians and the Scythians as useful allies who could offer both protection and favourable new opportunities to Mannai, thereby allowing him to become an opponent of the Neo-Assyrian Empire, and to remain an enemy of Sennacherib and his successors Esarhaddon and Ashurbanipal.

During the reign of the Neo-Assyrian king Esarhaddon (r. 681 – 669 BCE), the Scythians were active only on the western Iranian Plateau, especially in Mannai and Media, with their first ever recorded mention being from the Neo-Assyrian records of c. 680 BCE, detailing the first Scythian activities in West Asia and referring to the first recorded Scythian king, Išpakāya, as an ally of the Mannaians.

Around this time, Aḫšēri was hindering Neo-Assyrian operations between their own territory and Mannai, while the Scythians, along with the eastern Cimmerians, Mannaeans and Urartians, were recorded by the Neo-Assyrians as liable to menace communication between themselves and their vassal of Ḫubuškia, with messengers travelling between the two at risk of capture by hostile Cimmerian, Mannaean, Scythian or Urartian forces. Neo-Assyrian records also referred to joint Cimmerian-Scythian forces, along with the Medes and Mannaeans, as potential threats against the collection of tribute from Media.

During these attacks, the Scythians, along with the eastern Cimmerians on the border of Mannai, were able to reach far beyond the core territories of the Iranian Plateau, and to attack the Neo-Assyrian provinces of Parsuwaš and Bīt-Ḫambān even as far as Yašuḫ, Šamaš-naṣir and Zamuā in the valley of the Diyala river. One Scytho-Cimmerian attack that had invaded Ḫubuškia from Mannai was even able to threaten the core Neo-Assyrian territories, by passing through Anisus and Ḫarrāniya on the Lower Zab river to sack the small city of Milqiya near Arbaʾil, and near the Assyrian capitals. There they destroyed the Bīt-Akītī (House of the New Year Festival) of this city, later rebuilt by Esarhaddon. These attacks into their heartlands shocked the Assyrians, who sought through divination to know if they were to face more such invasions.

Meanwhile, Mannai, able to grow in power under Aḫšēri, perhaps because it had adapted and incorporated steppe nomad fighting technologies borrowed from its Cimmerian and Scythian allies, managed to capture the territories including the fortresses of Šarru-iqbi and Dūr-Illil from the Neo-Assyrian Empire and retain them until the c. 650s BCE.

The Urartian king Rusa II (r. 680 – 639 BCE) carried out major fortification construction projects around Lake Van, such as at Rusāipatari, and at Teišebaini near what is presently Yerevan, all intended to monitor the activities of the allied forces of the Scythians, Mannaians and Medes; other fortifications built by Rusa II were Qale Bordjy and Qale Sangar north of Lake Urmia, as well as the fortresses of Pir Chavush, Qale Gavur and Qiz Qale around the administrative centre of Haftavan Tepe to the northwest of the Lake.

These allied forces of the Cimmerians, Mannaeans and Scythians were defeated some time between c. 680 and c. 677 BCE by Sennacherib's son Esarhaddon (r. 681 – 669 BCE), who had succeeded him as the king of the Neo-Assyrian Empire and carried out a retaliatory campaign reaching deep into Median territory, as far as Mount Bikni and the country of Patušarra (Patischoria) on the limits of the Great Salt Desert. Išpakāya was killed in battle against Esarhaddon's forces during this campaign, and he was succeeded as king of the Scythians by Bartatua, with whom Esarhaddon might have immediately initiated negotiations.

Since the Cimmerians had left their Ciscausian homelands and moved into West Asia to seek plunder, they had little interest in the local affairs of the West Asian states, tending to hold out as mercenaries for the highest bidder: whence Esarhaddon taking advantage of this, at some point before c. 675 BCE, started secret negotiations with the eastern Cimmerians; these confirmed to the Assyrians that they would remain neutral, promising not to interfere when Esarhaddon invaded Mannai again in c. 675 BCE. Nonetheless, since the Cimmerians were distant foreigners with a very different culture, and thus did not fear the Mesopotamian gods, Esarhaddon's diviner and advisor Bēl-ušēzib referred to these eastern Cimmerians, rather than the Scythians, as possible allies of the Mannaeans, and advised Esarhaddon to spy on both them and the Mannaeans.

This second Assyrian invasion of Mannai however met with little success, because the Cimmerians with whom Esarhaddon had negotiated had deceived him in accepting his offer, only to attack his invasion force, and relations between Mannai and the Neo-Assyrian Empire would remain hostile, while the Cimmerians continued their alliance with Mannai until the period from 671 to 657 BCE. As a result of this failure, the Neo-Assyrian Empire was obliged to wait until the Cimmerians were no longer a threat, before mounting any further expeditions in Mannai.

From c. 674 to c. 672 BCE, the eastern Cimmerians were allied with the Medes, who had rebelled against the Neo-Assyrian Empire, and with the Scythians. During these years, the Assyrian holdings in Ellipi and Paršua were under constant threat of attack from the Cimmerians.

==== Alliance with the Neo-Assyrian Empire ====
The Neo-Assyrian Empire under Esarhaddon saw Kushite-ruled Egypt as its main military concern, wherefore he chose to limit spending resources on the other imperial borders, by securing good relations with Tabal, Elam, Urartu, and the Median city-states.

Furthermore, the Neo-Assyrian Empire did not remain on a defensive footing in response to the activities of the allied Cimmerian, Mannaean and Scythian forces, and it soon undertook diplomatic initiatives to separate Aḫšeri from his allies: it is in this context that the Esarhaddon had opened negotiations with Išpakāya's successor Bartatua to form friendly ties with the Scythians, and that he accepted when, by 672 BCE, in an act of careful diplomacy, Bartatua had asked for the hand of the eldest daughter of Esarhaddon, the Neo-Assyrian princess Šērūʾa-ēṭirat, and promised to form an alliance treaty with the Neo-Assyrian Empire.

The marriage between Bartatua and the Šērūʾa-ēṭirat likely took place: Bartatua's marriage to Šērūʾa-ēṭirat required that he pledge allegiance to Assyria as a vassal, and in accordance with Assyrian law, the territories ruled by him would become his fief granted by the Assyrian king, making the Scythian presence in West Asia a nominal extension of the Neo-Assyrian Empire, and Bartatua himself an Assyrian viceroy. Under this arrangement, the Scythians became one of the main political and military forces in West Asia, where their strength heavily depended on their cooperation with the Assyrian Empire: the Scythian kingdom would remain a Neo-Assyrian ally for some time thereafter.

Following this marriage, the Scythians ceased to be referred to as an enemy force in the Neo-Assyrian records. With the alliance thus concluded, the Scythian kingdom would remain on friendly and peaceful terms with the Neo-Assyrian Empire.

Unions between Scythians and West Asians were not limited to royalty, and the appearance of jewellery decorated using granulation and filigree in the core Ciscaucasian territory of the Scythian kingdom attests that Scythian men married or took as concubines West Asian women who followed them back to Ciscaucasia.

Scythian troops appear to also have served in the Urartian army at this time, with the burial of a Scythian lord together with his horses under a Urartian building at Norşuntepe suggesting that Scythian troops were guarding the western border of Urartu under the reign of Rusa II. The earliest demonstrable presence of silk in West Asia was found in a Urartian fortress, presumably imported from China through the intermediary of the Scythians, and suggesting that the trade of silk to western Eurasia might have started at this time, through the intermediary of the Scythians during their stay in West Asia.

The eastern Cimmerians meanwhile remained hostile to Assyria, and, along with the Medes, were the allies of Ellipi against an invasion by the Neo-Assyrian Empire between c. 672 and c. 669 BCE. The eastern Cimmerians in alliance with Urartu attacked the Assyrian province of Šubria during this time.

And when the Median ruler Kaštaritu rebelled against the Neo-Assyrian Empire and founded the first independent kingdom of the Medes, after successfully liberating them from Neo-Assyrian overlordship from c. 671 to c. 669 BCE, the eastern Cimmerians became allied with him.

==== West Asian influences on the Scythians ====
The marital alliance between the Scythian king and the Assyrian ruling dynasty, as well as the proximity of the Scythians to the Assyrian-influenced states of Mannai and Urartu, thus placed the Scythians under the strong influence of Assyrian culture, and the contact with West Asian civilisation became the most important outside influence in the formation of Scythian culture and society throughout the 7th century BCE:

Scythian culture and art took their definitive form to serve the interests of the Scythian aristocracy establishing its hegemony in West Asia over the years c. 650 to c. 600 BCE, when it absorbed various West Asian elements; Scythian dress and armour from this time, as well as the artefacts, motifs, style and technique of the grave goods used in the kurgans of the Scythian kingdom's core territory in Ciscaucasia, all reflect the heavy influence then from West Asia and the Iranian Plateau upon Scythian culture.

Under West Asian influence, Scythian rulers began emulating the kings of the Neo-Assyrian Empire, Urartu and Media, using luxury goods as status markers: the Scythians profited especially significantly in this regard from their activities in West Asia, obtaining spoils whether as diplomatic presents or as plunder, used to enhance their status back in their kingdom's core territory in the Ciscaucasian Steppe. The Assyrian- and Urartian-made grave goods in the Ciscaucasian Scythian kurgans thus reflect the introduction of cultural elements into that region from West Asia.

Thus, during this period, large amounts of goods, especially luxury items, were flowing from West Asia into the Scythian core territories on the steppe, fashioned by West Asian craftsmen for Scythian patrons, and attesting to the Caucasus Mountains' role as a porous boundary through which the Scythians could obtain desirable goods from the peoples of West Asia. Examples of these goods include a sword scabbard, an axe overlay, a pair of gold cups, a silver mirror, all of West Asian origin and found in one of the Kelermes kurgans and the Melhuniv kurgan, as well as Assyrian-made jewellery, such as coiled earrings, diadems decorated with rosettes, and other objects decorated with stamping, granulation and filigree.

In addition to the imported West Asian luxury goods, newer concepts also flowed northward from West Asia into the Ciscaucasian Steppe, tending to enhance the artistic range of the craftsmen serving the Scythian aristocracy: the Scythians would absorb West Asian tastes and customs, such as the concept of the divine origin of royal power. As their material culture was absorbing West Asian elements, so too was their art absorbing West Asian artistic modes of representing these, as evidenced by some luxury goods available to Scythian aristocrats combining native Scythian motifs with West Asian ones, for example, the mingling of West Asian-style and nomadic beasts and depictions of the Tree of Life on Scythian gold sword sheaths.

These luxury goods were made by West Asian craftsmen for Scythian rulers, with the gold overlays of the two swords and the axe from Kelermes and Melhuniv implying that the Scythians were then under strong Urartian artistic influence, or that Urartian craftsmen were producing metalwork for Scythian patrons. Scythian chariot parts, ritual horse attire, bowls, stolls, clothing elements, personal jewellery such as diadems and earrings, in particular, were imported through such West Asian craftsmen, who might have accompanied the Scythians back into their Ciscaucasian core territory, where their skills were highly prized.

In addition, it was only when the Scythians expanded into West Asiathat they became acquainted with iron smelting and forging, whereas until the late 8th century BCE they had been a Bronze Age society. Some West Asian blacksmiths might have accompanied the Scythians on their northward returns and become employed by Scythian kings. The Scythians also borrowed the use of the war chariots and scale armour from West Asians, and Scythian warriors too obtained iron weapons and military experience during their stay in West Asia.

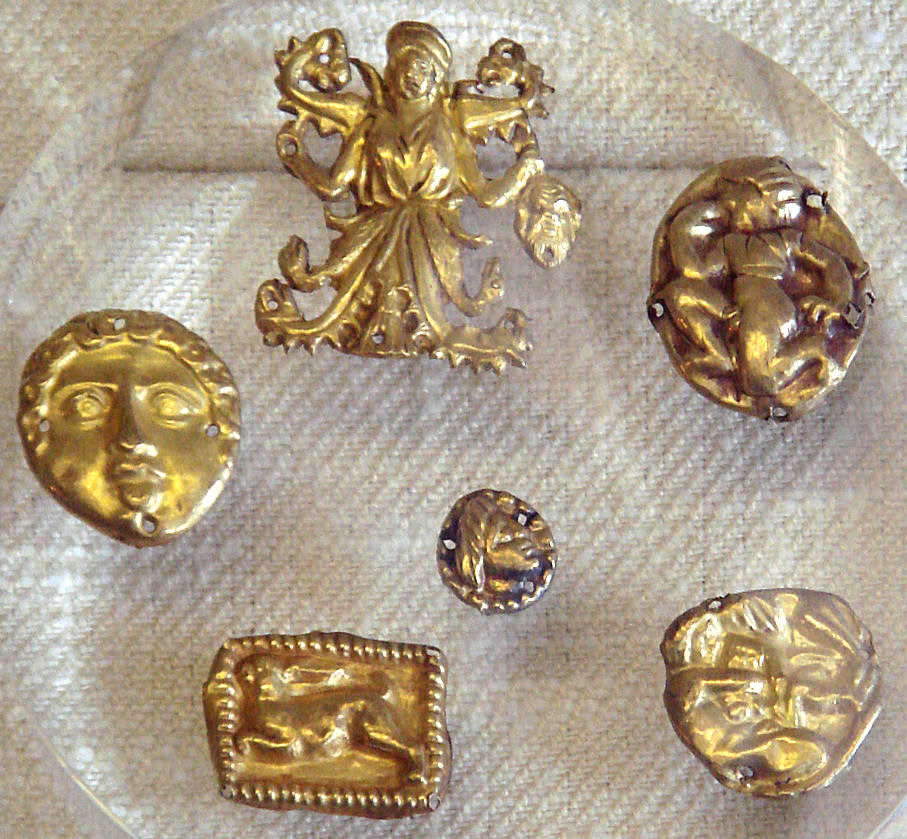
The Scythian Snake-Legged Goddess and other artifacts, from Kul-Oba.

Assyrian- and Urartian-style horse equipment found in Scythian kurgans of this time also attests to the importation of West Asian horses into Ciscaucasia during the Scythian presence in West Asia.

Within the Scythian religion, the goddess Artimpasa and the Snake-Legged Goddess were significantly influenced by the Mesopotamian and Syro-Canaanite religions, absorbing elements from ʿAštart-Ištar-Aphrodite for Artimpasa and from ʿAttarʿattā-Derketō for the Snake-Legged Goddess. Scythian chariot parts from this period were decorated with images of the goddess Ištar stylised like those from Neo-Assyrian reliefs.

Reflecting West Asian influences on Scythian religion, a fire temple was built near the first Krasnoye Znamya kurgan according to the rules of Median fire temples, suggesting that Median builders might have moved to Ciscaucasia to build it.

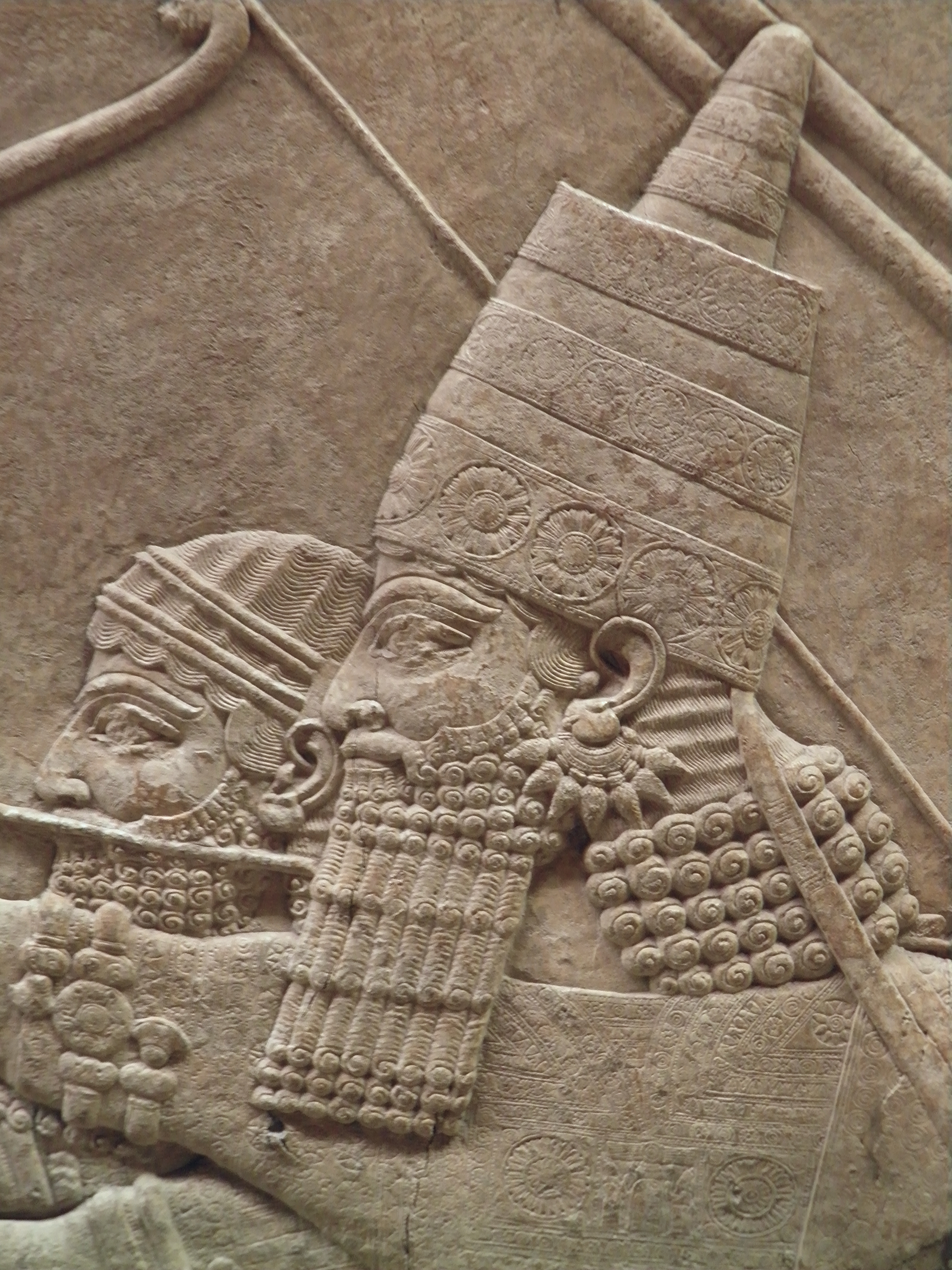
The Assyrian king Ashurbanipal

=== Conquest of Mannai ===
Some time in the late 660s or early 650s BCE, the eastern Cimmerians left the Iranian Plateau and retreated westward into Anatolia, to join the western Cimmerians operating there.

Although Mannai had been powerful under its king Aḫšeri, this power had depended on his alliance with the Cimmerians and Scythians to protect his kingdom from attacks by the Neo-Assyrian Empire, and their departure thus provided Esarhaddon's son and successor to the Neo-Assyrian throne, Ashurbanipal (r. 669 – 631 BCE), an opportunity to carry out a campaign against Mannai over the years 660 to 659 BCE, and recover some of the settlements that the Mannaeans had previously captured.

Aḫšeri tried in vain to stop the Neo-Assyrian advance, but he was otherwise able to withstand the Neo-Assyrian invasion. Aḫšeri had also depended on the Cimmerians to suppress internal opposition to his rule, and their absence weakened him enough that he was soon overthrown by a popular rebellion and killed along with most of his dynasty by a peasant revolt. Aḫšeri's surviving son, Uallî, requested help from Ashurbanipal; this was provided through the intermediary of Ashurbanipal's brother-in-law, the Scythian king Bartatua, who annexed Mannai into the Scythian kingdom. Meanwhile Uallî repressed the rebellion before ascending to the throne of Mannai and submitting to the Neo-Assyrian Empire. Despite this defeat, Mannai remained a significant power until the rise of the Median Empire in the late 7th century BCE.

Following the Scythian acquisition of Mannai, the centre of Scythian power in West Asia shifted to the region of Lake Urmia, between the Caspian Sea and the Zagros Mountains in the northwest of the Iranian Plateau, where the fertile pastures around the lake allowed the Scythians to rear the large herds of horses that they depended on. Thenceforth, the site corresponding to present-day Saqqez became the political centre of the Scythians in West Asia.

=== Reign of Madyes ===
Bartatua was succeeded by his son with Šērūʾa-ēṭirat, Madyes, who remained an ally of the Neo-Assyrian Empire.

==== Conquest of Media ====
In 652 BCE, Esarhaddon's eldest son, Šamaš-šuma-ukin, who had succeeded him as king of Babylon, rebelled against his younger brother Ashurbanipal: it took Ashurbanipal four years to fully suppress the Babylonian rebellion by 648 BCE, and another year to destroy the power of Elam, who had supported Šamaš-šuma-ukin, and, although Ashurbanipal would nevertheless be able to maintain control over Babylonia for the rest of his reign, the Neo-Assyrian Empire emerged from this crisis severely worn out.

By 625 BCE, the Medes had acquired knowledge of new ideologies and military technologies, both from more sedentary powers like the Neo-Assyrian Empire and Urartu, and from steppe nomads like the Cimmerians and Scythians. Owing to successful integration of these influences by the Medes, their king Phraortes had been able to combine Scythian and Neo-Assyrian military practices to create an organised army composed of distinct corps of spearmen, archers, and cavalry, thereby transforming Media into the dominant power of the Iranian Plateau.

When the revolt in Babylonia broke out, Phraortes supported Šamaš-šuma-ukin, while Madyes helped Ashurbanipal to repress the revolt externally, by invading the Medes and imposing Scythian hegemony on Media.

Under Scythian rule, the Medes adopted still more Scythian weaponry and military tactics, especially in the domains of archery and cavalry warfare.

==== Scythian hegemony in West Asia ====
The Scythian conquest of Media marked the beginning of a nearly 30-year long period of Scythian hegemony in West Asia, which Graeco-Roman authors later called the "Scythian rule over Upper Asia," when the Scythian kingdom not only held hegemony in Trauscaucasia and Mannai, but soon extended their rule to Urartu and Anatolia as well, with the various states in these regions, such as Mannai, Urartu and Media, continuing to exist under the suzerainty of the Scythian kingdom and tributary to it.

==== Defeat of the Cimmerians ====
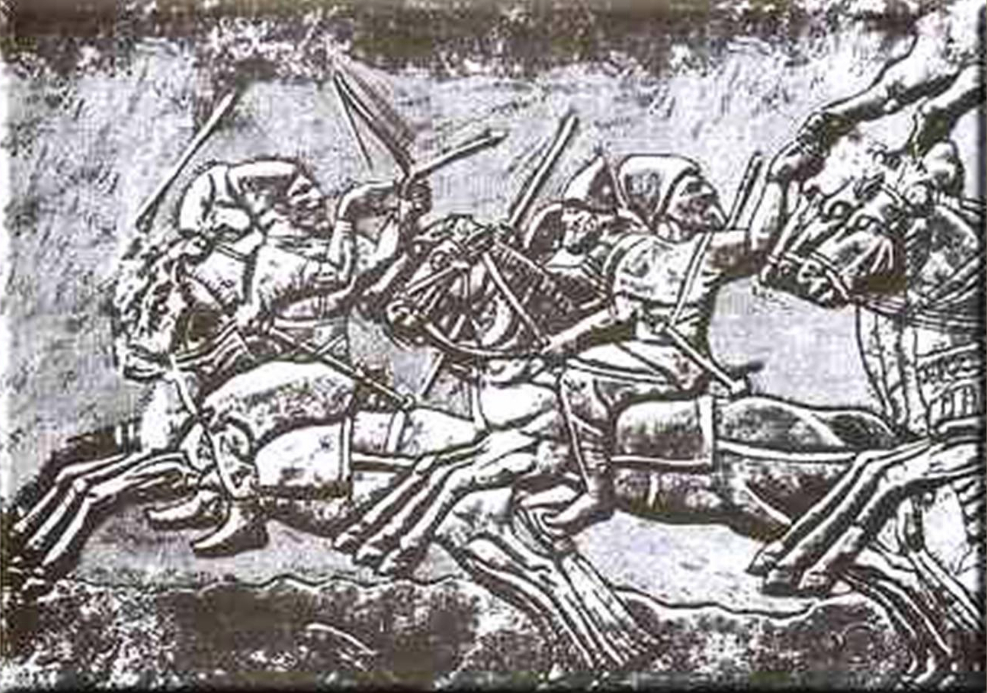
An Assyrian relief depicting Cimmerian mounted warriors

===== Cimmerian activities in Anatolia =====
During the 7th century BCE, the bulk of the Cimmerians were operating in Anatolia, where they controlled a large territory bordering Lydia in the west, covering Phrygia, and reaching Cilicia and the borders of Urartu in the east.

The disturbances experienced by the Neo-Assyrian Empire as result of the activities of the Cimmerians in Anatolia led many of the rulers of this region to try to break away from Neo-Assyrian overlordship, so that the Cimmerians had effectively ended Neo-Assyrian control in Anatolia by the time Esarhaddon had been succeeded as king of the Neo-Assyrian Empire by Ashurbanipal. By 657 BCE, Neo-Assyrian records were referring to a Cimmerian threat against the western possessions of the Neo-Assyrian Empire in the province of Que, or even in part of the Levant.

In 657 BCE, Assyrian divinatory records were calling the Cimmerian king Dugdammî (the Lygdamis of the Greek authors) by the title of šar-kiššati (lit. 'King of the Universe'), which in the Mesopotamian worldview had belonged to the King of the Neo-Assyrian Empire, was usurped by the Cimmerians, and needed to be won back. This situation remained unchanged throughout the rest of the 650s and the early 640s BCE.

===== Cimmerian alliance with the Treres =====
Around the c. 660s BCE, the Thracian tribe of the Treres migrated across the Thracian Bosporus and invaded Anatolia from the northwest, after which they allied with the Cimmerians, and, from around the c. 650s BCE, the Cimmerians were nomadising in Anatolia along with the Treres.

==== Cimmerian attack on Lydia and Asian Greece ====
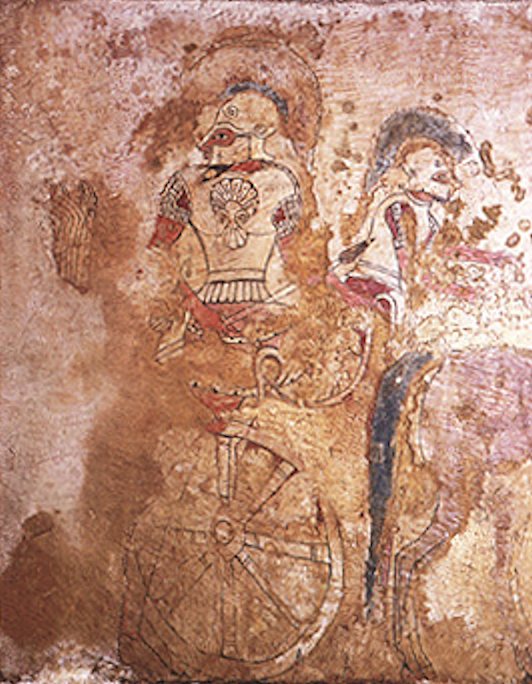
Lycian charioteer warriors

In 644 BCE, the Cimmerians and Treres under the Cimmerian king Dugdammî and the Treran king Kōbos, and in alliance with the Lycians or Lycaonians, attacked Lydia for a second time in 644 BCE: this time they defeated the Lydians and captured their capital city of Sardis except for its citadel, and the Lydian king Gyges died during this attack.

After sacking Sardis, Lydgamis and Kobos led the Cimmerians and the Treres to invade the Greek city-states of the Troad, Aeolia and Ionia on the western coast of Anatolia, where they destroyed the city of Magnesia on the Meander as well as the Artemision of Ephesus.

===== Cimmerian activities in Cilicia =====
Sensing the exhaustion of Neo-Assyrian power following the suppression of the revolt of Šamaš-šuma-ukin, the Cimmerians moved to Cilicia on the northwest border of the Neo-Assyrian Empire in c. 640 BCE, immediately after their third invasion of Lydia and the attack on the Asian Greek cities. There, Dugdammî allied with the currently rebelling Assyrian vassal state of Tabal, under Mussi, to attack the Neo-Assyrian Empire.

However, Mussi died before the planned attack on the Neo-Assyrian Empire, while Dugdammî carried it out but failed because, according to Neo-Assyrian sources, fire broke out in his camp. Following this, Dugdammî was faced with a revolt against himself, which ended his hostilities against the Neo-Assyrian Empire; he then sent tribute to Ashurbanipal to form an alliance with him, and Ashurbanipal forced Dugdammi to swear an oath to not attack the Neo-Assyrian Empire.

===== Death of Dugdammî =====
Dugdammî soon broke his oath and attacked the Neo-Assyrian Empire again, but during this military campaign he contracted a grave illness with symptoms including paralysis of half of his body and vomiting of blood as well as gangrene of the genitals, culminating in his suicide in 640 BCE in Ḫilakku.

Dugdammî was succeeded as king of the western Cimmerians in Ḫilakku by his son Sandakšatru, who continued Dugdammî's attacks against the Neo-Assyrian Empire, but he too failed as had his father.

===== Decline of the Cimmerians =====
The power of the Cimmerians dwindled quickly after the death of Dugdammî, although the Lydian kings Ardys and Sadyattes might have either died fighting the Cimmerians, or been deposed for being incapable of efficiently fighting them, respectively in c. 637 and c. 635 BCE.

===== Rise of the Lydian Empire =====
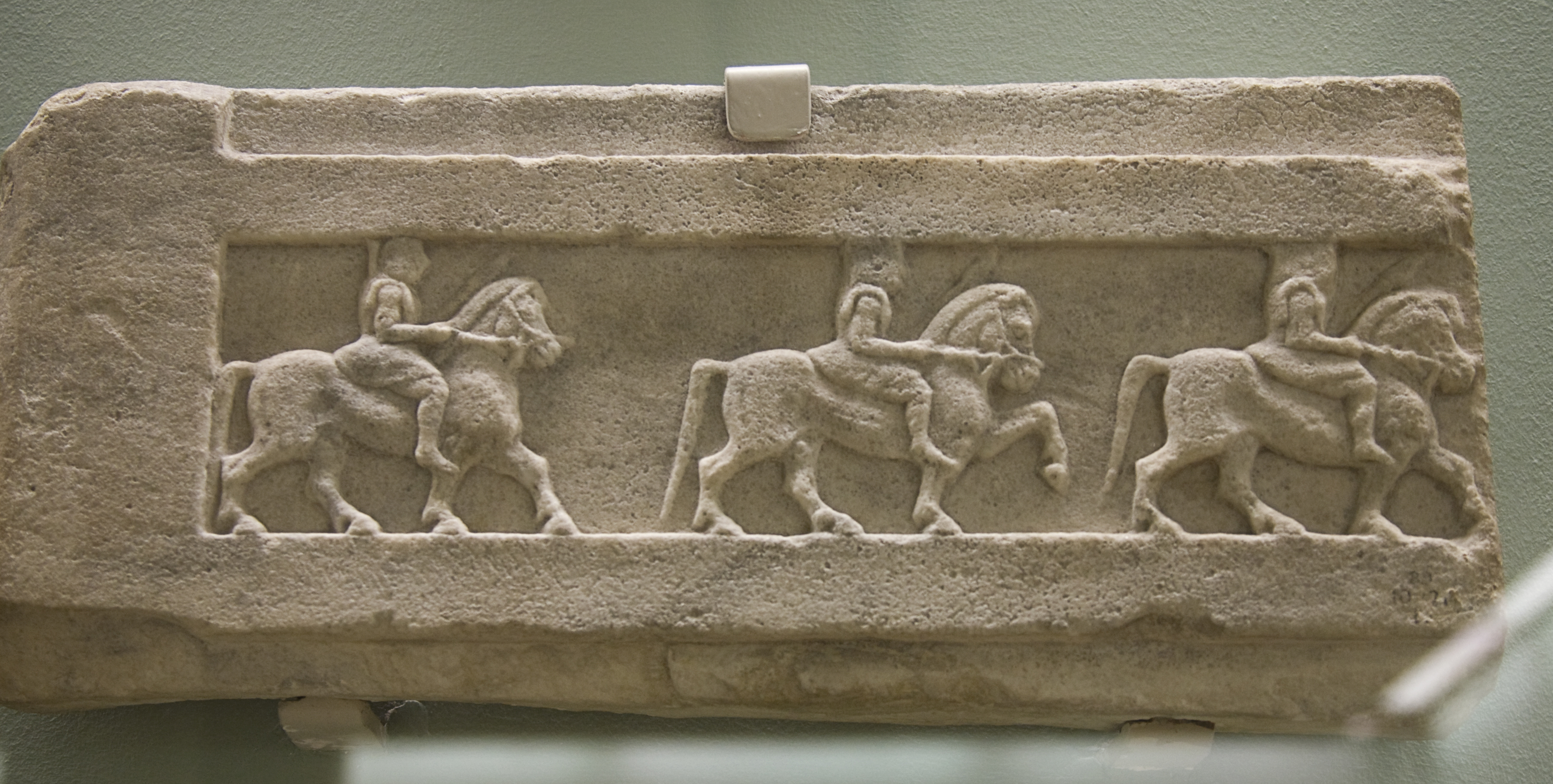
A relief depicting mounted Lydian warriors on slab of marble from a tomb

Despite these setbacks, the Lydian kingdom was able to grow in power, and the Lydians appear to have adopted Cimmerian military practices such as the use of mounted cavalry, with the Lydians fighting using long spears and archers, both on horseback.

Around c. 635 BCE, and with Neo-Assyrian approval, the Scythians under Madyes conquered Urartu, entered Central Anatolia and defeated the Cimmerians and Treres. This final defeat of the Cimmerians was carried out by the joint forces of Madyes's Scythians, whom Strabo of Amasia credits with expelling the Treres from Asia Minor, and of the Lydians led by their king Alyattes, (son of Sadyattes, as well as the grandson of Ardys and the great-grandson of Gyges) -- whom Herodotus of Halicarnassus and Polyaenus of Bithynia claimed permanently defeated the Cimmerians so that they no longer constituted a threat.

In Polyaenus's account of the defeat of the Cimmerians, he claimed that Alyattes used "war dogs" to expel them from Asia Minor, with the term "war dogs" being a Greek folkloric reinterpretation of young Scythian warriors who, following the Indo-European passage rite of the *Kóryos, would ritually take on the role of wolf- or dog-warriors.

The Cimmerians completely disappeared from history following this final defeat, and they were soon assimilated by the populations of Anatolia. It was also around this time that the last still-existing Syro-Hittite and Aramaean states in Anatolia, which had been either independent or vassals of the Neo-Assyrian Empire, Phrygia, Urartu, or the Cimmerians, also finally disappeared, although the exact circumstances of their end are still very uncertain.

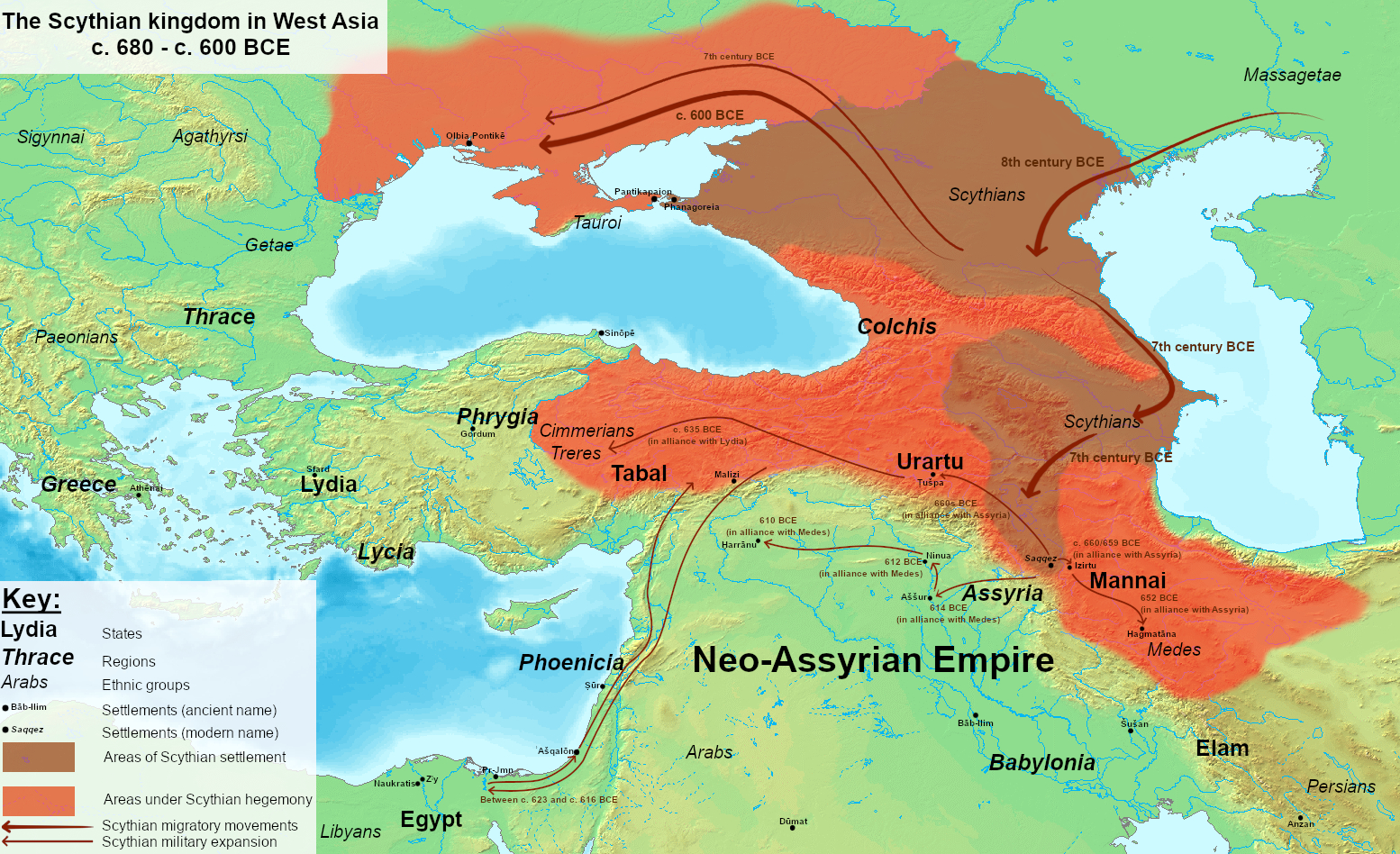
The maximum extent of the Scythian kingdom in West Asia.

Scythian power in West Asia thus reached its peak under Madyes, with the West Asian territories ruled by the Scythian kingdom extending from the Halys river in Anatolia in the west to the Caspian Sea and the eastern borders of Media in the east, and from Transcaucasia in the north to the northern borders of the Neo-Assyrian Empire in the south. Following the defeat of the Cimmerians and the disappearance of the other Anatolian states, it was the new Lydian Empire of Alyattes that became the dominant power of Anatolia.

Archaeologically, the movement of the Cimmerians and Scythians into Anatolia corresponds to the expansion of the Scythian culture into this region.

It was also at this time that the Scythians first came into contact with the Greeks, in Anatolia.

==== First wave of Greek colonisation ====
The ancient Greeks had first made expeditions in the Black Sea in the 8th century BCE, and encounters with friendly native populations quickly stimulated trade relations and the development of more regular commercial transits, leading in turn to the formation of trading settlements.

After the Greek city-states in the Aegean Sea began to experience social tensions caused by the growth of their populations and the Cimmerian invasions of Ionia in the middle of the 7th century BCE, the shores of the Black Sea became a propitious destination to establish settlements since its coasts provided safe ports, defendable locations, and plenty of fish in the seas, estuaries and rivers. Furthermore, the local population in the North Pontic region was already producing a surplus of goods such as grain, facilitating the peaceful formation of relations with the local peoples, and the early development of trade with the peoples of the forest steppe.

The main agent for the Greek colonisation of the shores of the Black Sea was the city of Miletus from Ionia in western Anatolia, responsible for founding around 90 colonies, and other cities of Ionia, such as Samos and Chios, were also important participants in this process.

Thus, soon after, around c. 625 BCE, the Scythians in the Pontic Steppe came into contact with Greek settlers from Miletus who were starting to found their first colonies in areas under Scythian rule on the northern coast of the Black Sea. This process of colonisation put the Scythians' nomadic world of the steppes into permanent contact with the urban one of the Aegean Greeks for the rest of their history.

===== First Greek trade outposts =====
The first wave of Greek colonisation of the north coast of the Black Sea consisted of attempts to develop trade with its native populations, and therefore involved the formation of trading enclaves (Ancient Greek: ἐμπόρια, romanized: empória; Latin: emporia) that had to be set up at locations providing safe approach and good docking facilities, as well as granting access to the major rivers of the steppe through which the inland regions of the forest steppe could be reached; these rivers were important in their role as routes whereby various goods could be shipped south to the Greek colonies. The native populations and the colonists saw this process, intended to establish trade connections in places that already had a sparse population, rather than to obtain land, as mutually beneficial; as a result, it was largely peaceful.

Therefore, the earliest emporia of the north Black Sea were built at Histria on the mouth of the Istros river, at Tyras on a promontory commanding the estuary of the Tyras river, and especially on the island of Borysthenēs, near the joint estuary of the Hypanis and Borysthenēs rivers and thereby granting access to both. The emporion of Borysthenēs would thrive during the rest of the 7th century BCE, and throughout the following 6th century BCE.

These emporia were useful for the commercial ventures of their mother cities, by acting as markets where oil, wine and manufactured goods could be exchanged with the native populations for foodstuffs and rare raw materials such as grain, fish, animal products, metals, forest products, furs, and slaves brought through the inland trading networks. The success of this trade, as a result, constituted a means for the Greek colonies as well as their home cities to increase their power and wealth.

==== Decline in West Asia ====
By the mid-620s BCE, the Neo-Assyrian Empire began unravelling after the death of Ashurbanipal: in addition to internal instability within Assyria arising from civil wars under his successors Aššur-etil-ilāni (r. 631 – 627 BCE) and Sîn-šar-iškun (r. 627 – 612 BCE), Babylon also revolted against the Assyrians in 626 BCE under the leadership of Nabopolassar, and the Assyrian general Sîn-šumu-līšir likewise rebelled against Sîn-šar-iškun in 626 BCE.

===== Revolt of Media =====
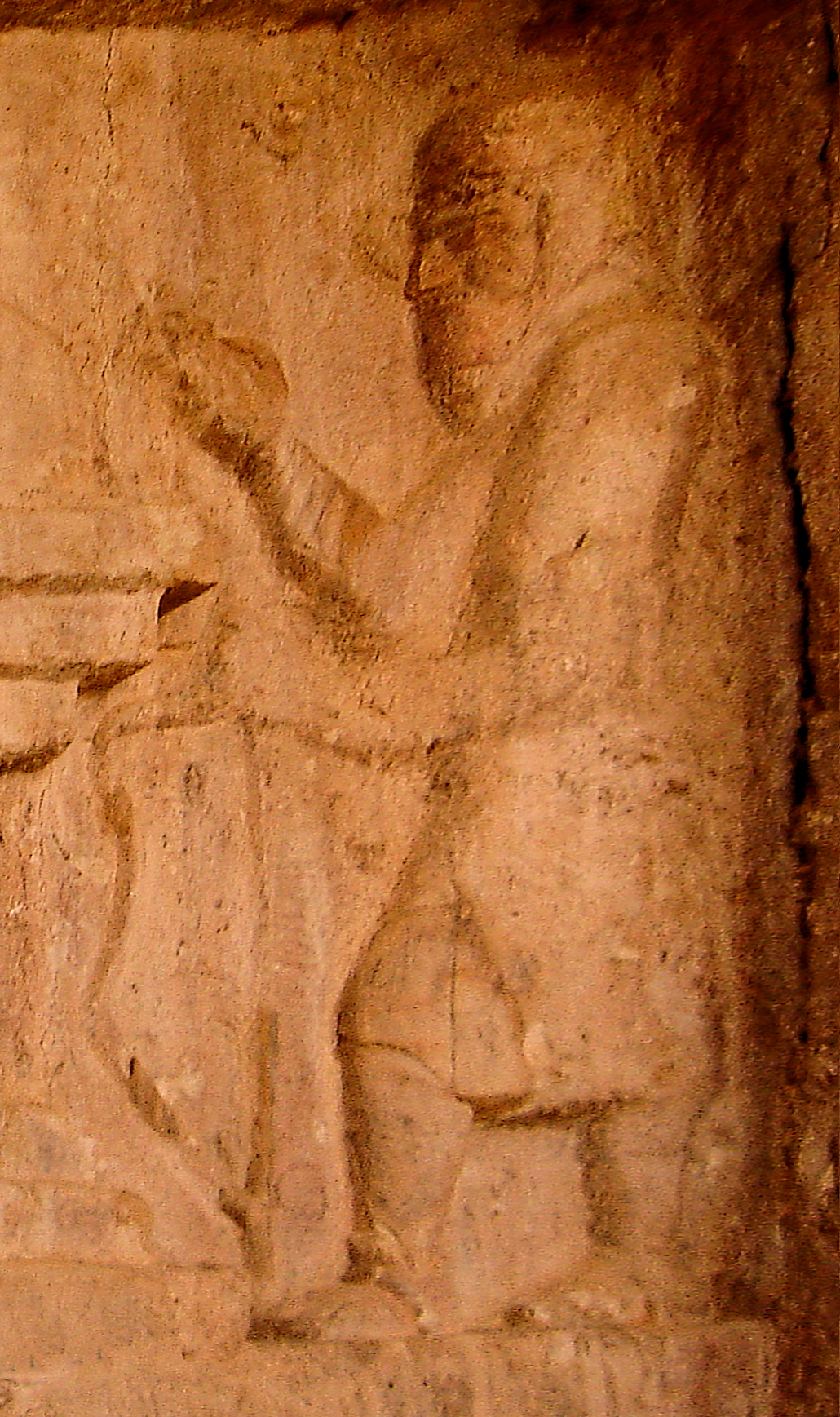
The Median king Cyaxares

By then, the Median king Cyaxares had grown powerful and started negotiations with the Scythians. The next year, in 625 BCE, he invited the Scythian leaders to a feast at his palace, where he made them drunk and assassinated them all, thus overthrowing the Assyro-Scythian yoke over the Medes, and making them one of the first peoples to acquire independence from the Neo-Assyrian Empire.

The assassination of the Scythian rulers by Cyaxares brought an end to the hegemony of the Scythian kingdom in West Asia, after which its activities became limited to the eastern borderlands of the Neo-Assyrian Empire, and the importation of West Asian goods into the Scythian kingdom's core territories of the Ciscaucasian steppe ended.

The Medes by this time had acquired knowledge of military innovations both from the sedentary powers like the Neo-Assyrian Empire and Urartu, and from the steppe nomads like the Cimmerians and the Scythians: this became evident in terms of weapons and military tactics, particularly in archery.) Thus Cyaxares was able to combine Scythian and Neo-Assyrian military practices and create an organised army composed of distinct divisions of spearmen, archers, and cavalry, thereby transforming Media into the dominant power of the Iranian Plateau again, as Phraortes had done previously.

Following the successful revolts of Babylonia under Nabopolassar and Media under Cyaxares, the various vassals of the Neo-Assyrian Empire in Anatolia and on the Iranian Plateau started breaking away from Neo-Assyrian rule.

===== Raid into the Levant =====
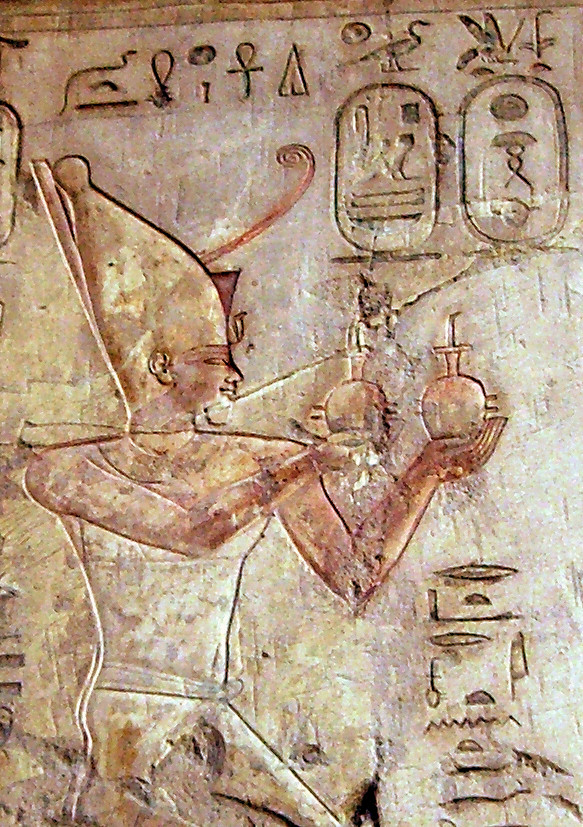
The pharaoh Psamtik I

With the power of their former Neo-Assyrian allies crumbling during the mid-620s BCE, and the newly ascending Neo-Babylonian and Median empires having not yet consolidated themselves, the Scythians took advantage of the power vacuum to raid into the Levant some time between c. 626 and c. 616 BCE. It is unknown whether this raid damaged the hold of the Neo-Assyrian Empire on its western provinces, although the last known Neo-Assyrian presence in Phoenicia dates from around this time, in the form of the mention of the governor of Ṣumur, Mannu-kī-aḫḫē, in a list of eponyms from c. 619 BCE.

The Scythian raid into the Levant reached as far south as Palestine, and was foretold by the Judahite prophets Isaiah, Jeremiah and Zephaniah, who foretold of a pending "Disaster from the North" which they believed would result in the destruction of Jerusalem. However, the Scythian raid did not affect Jerusalem or even the kingdom of Judah, which caused Jeremiah to lose favour with the Judahite king Josiah, who instead turned to the prophetess Huldah for counsel, and led to Jeremiah temporarily stopping prophesying for some years.

The Scythian raid reached the borders of the Saite Egyptian kingdom, where their advance was stopped by the marshes of the Nile Delta, after which the pharaoh Psamtik I met them and convinced them to turn back by offering them gifts.

Though sparing Jerusalem, the Scythians sacked several other cities in Palestine while retreating, including the temple of the goddess ʿAštart in Ascalon. According to later Graeco-Roman authors, this the shrine of Ascalon was considered to be the most ancient of all temples to that goddess, purportedly causing the perpetrators of this sacrilege and their descendants to be cursed by ʿAštart with a "female disease", becoming a class of transvestite diviners called the Anarya (lit. 'unmanly' in Scythian).

==== War against the Neo-Assyrian Empire ====
Having reorganised his kingdom and grown his military power, Cyaxares attacked the Neo-Assyrian Empire; meanwhile, Nabopolassar had managed to take control of all Babylonia by 620 BCE, and by 616 BCE he was militarily comfortable enough to attack the Assyrian core territories; and Nabopolassar and Cyaxares soon allied with each other against the Neo-Assyrian Empire.

By 615, the Scythian kingdom was in an alliance with the Medes termed Umman Manda ("the horde from who knows where?") in Assyrian records. Scythia operated with Cyaxares in his war against the Neo-Assyrian Empire, possibly out of necessity, the abandonment its former alliance with Assyria to side with the Neo-Babylonians and Medes becoming a critical factor in the worsening military position of the Neo-Assyrian Empire. The Scythian kingdom supported the Medo-Babylonian conquests of Aššur in 614 BCE, of Nineveh in 612 BCE, and of the last Neo-Assyrian remnants at Ḫarran in 610 BCE, which permanently destroyed the Neo-Assyrian Empire.

The presence of Scythian-style arrowheads at locations where the Neo-Babylonian Empire is known to have conducted military campaigns, and associated with the destruction layers of these campaigns, suggests that certain contingents composed of Scythians, or Medes who had adopted Scythian archery techniques, might have been recruited by the Neo-Babylonian army during this war. The Neo-Babylonian archery divisions themselves were influenced by Scythian archery techniques, because Scythian bows were more powerful than Akkadian ones.

Clay figurines depicting Scythian riders, as well as an Ionian shield and a Neo-Hittite battle-axe similar to those found in Scythian remains in the Pontic steppe, suggest that such contingents as well as other Scythian mercenaries had also participated at the final Neo-Babylonian victory over the Egyptians at Carchemish.

The Scythian or Scythian-style contingents moreover took part in the Neo-Babylonian campaigns in the southern Levant, including in the Babylonian annexation of the kingdom of Judah in 586 BCE.

==== Beginning of Graeco-Scythian commercial activities ====
From the Greek settlements on the Black Sea coast, the Scythian aristocracy especially bought luxury goods which they used flauntingly during their lives and in their tombs as status markers: wine and the various Greek vessels used to mix and drink it were especially imported in large quantities and were even used as grave goods, while craftsmen in the Greek colonies manufactured items made of gold or electrum for Scythian patrons.

Once Scythian activities begun to decline West Asia in the c. 620s BCE and ties between the Scythians and the Greek colonies started developing concurrently, the Scythians started buying Greek pottery imported from the Aegean islands, and a new thriving source of trade for the Scythian kingdom was created in the north shore of the Black Sea. Thus ended the importation into the Scythian kingdom's core territories of the Ciscaucasian steppe of West Asian goods, which were replaced by goods bought from the Greek colonies or commissioned from Greek craftsmen by Scythian patrons over the course of c. 625 to c. 600 BCE, thus resulting in Greek influences on the Scythians replacing West Asian ones from the beginning of the 6th century BCE.

The relations between the Scythian kingdom and the Greek colonies of the northern Pontic region therefore remained initially largely peaceful, thanks to which the Greek cities possessed no defensive walls.

==== Expulsion from West Asia ====
By the c. 590s BCE, the ascending Median Empire of Cyaxares annexed Urartu, after having already annexed Mannai in 616 BCE. This rise of Median power forced the Scythian kingdom to leave West Asia and retreat northward into the Ciscaucasian Steppe, after which the Scythian activities in West Asia, as well as the ties between West Asians and the Scythians over the course of the 7th century BCE, and West Asian influences on the Scythians, all came to an end around c. 610-600 BCE.

Nevertheless, even after the Scythians' retreat from West Asia, complex relations continued to exist between the Median and Scythian kingdoms located, respectively, to the south and north of the Caucasus Mountains, with the Scythians continuing to be involved as partners and enemies of the Median kingdom in the Caucasian region.

===== Remnants in West Asia =====
Some splinter Scythian groups nevertheless remained in eastern Transcaucasia, especially in the area corresponding to modern-day Azerbaijan, and did not retreat to the north. Therefore, the area where they lived was called Sakašayana (lit. 'land inhabited by the Saka (that is, by Scythians)') by the Medes; this name was later recorded as Sakasēnē (Σακασηνή) by Ptolemy, and its inhabitants were called the Skythēnoi (Σκυθηνοί) by Xenophon of Athens, as Sakesinai (Σακεσίναι) by Arrian of Nicomedia, and as the Sacassānī by Titus Livius.

These Scythians served in the army of Cyaxares, where they participated in the Median conquest of Urartu, and it was one such Scythian division was responsible for the capture and destruction of the fortresses of Argištiḫinili and Teišebaini in northern Urartu. The Median kingdom might also have employed Scythians as hunters to provide the court with game.

Hostilities eventually broke out between Cyaxares and some of these Scythians serving him, likely as a result of the Median kingdom ending the autonomy of these Scythians and fully annexing them. Later Graeco-Roman sources claimed that these Scythians left the Median kingdom and fled into the Lydian Empire, beginning a conflict between Lydia and Media: in the first two decades of the 6th century BCE, the Median westwards expansion from the Iranian Plateau and the Lydian eastwards expansion from Anatolia came to blows, resulting in a war which lasted from c. 590 and ended only due to a solar eclipse in 585 BCE, after which peace was made between Lydia and Media and a new political order was established in West Asia.

These Scythians who had remained in West Asia had been completely assimilated into Median society and state by the mid-6th century BCE so that they no longer constituted an independent group and no longer had a separate identity of their own.

=== North Pontic Scythian kingdom ===
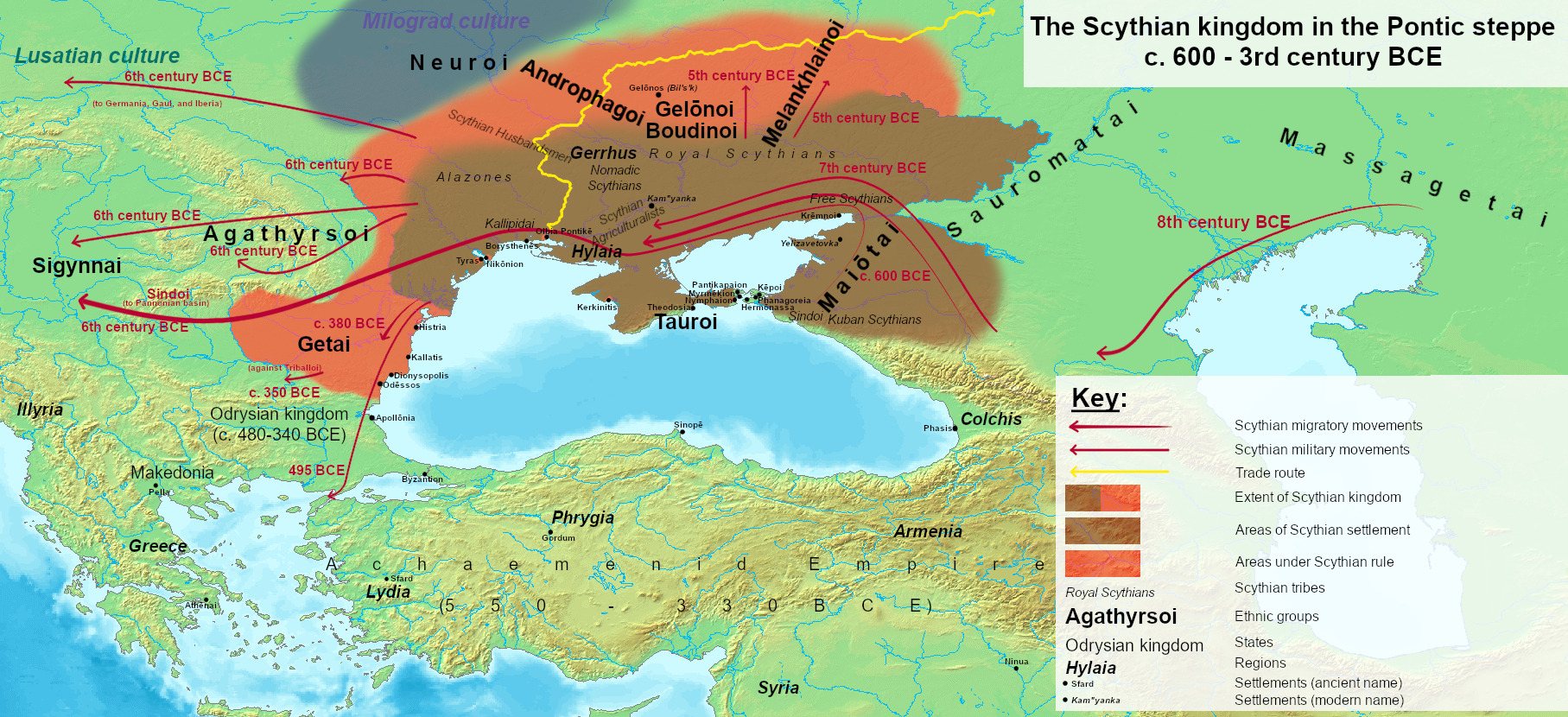
The Scythian kingdom in the Pontic steppe at its maximum extent in the 6th century BCE

After their expulsion from West Asia, the majority of the Scythians returned to the parts of the Ciscaucasian Steppe corresponding to present-day Stavropol and the Kuban river valley before moving into the Pontic Steppe, which only then started being occupied by the Scythians in bulk and on a large scale, resulting in the Pontic Steppe becoming the centre of Scythian power. Among the Scythians who had still remained in Ciscaucasia, the influence of the native populations of this region became more prominent during this period.

This movement of the Scythians into the Pontic Steppe was motivated by two main factors:

- to the south of the Caucasus was the powerful but hostile Median Empire, which compromised the security of the Scythian realm in Ciscaucasia;
- the Greek colonies on the shores of the Black Sea to the south and the mixed farmers of the forest steppe to the north essential source of trade for the Scythians, thus being a place from where they could obtain significant wealth.

The Scythian settlement in the Pontic Steppe had thus placed them in an extremely advantageous position:

- to the north, in the forest steppe, lived large settled mixed farmer populations who produced a large variety of highly sought-after commodities such as iron, charcoal, furs, honey, slaves, and grain;
- to the south, on the north shore of the Black Sea, were the Greek colonies which were seeking raw materials and manpower for their own use, as well as to export to Greece.

This situation therefore allowed the Scythian kingdom to mediate the thriving trade that the Greek colonies to their south were carrying out with the sedentary peoples of the forest steppe to their north, and which was carried out via the large rivers of the Scythian steppe flowing southwards into the Black Sea and formed the main access routes to these northern markets. The relations between the Scythian kingdom and the Greek traders were therefore mutually beneficial and influenced both the nomadic Scythians and the forest steppe populations, with the Scythian aristocracy profiting significantly from this trade.

The Pontic Steppe was therefore a particularly attractive territory for the Scythians to occupy, not only because it was an ideal terrain for their warrior pastoralist lifestyle, but also because it allowed them to obtain grain to supplement their diet from the mixed farmer population of the forest steppe to their north, and exotic luxury goods for their aristocracy to use as status markers from the Greek colonies on the shore of the Black Sea.

Attesting of this Scythian movement out of Ciscaucasia and into the Pontic Steppe, as well as of their deepening of the connections with the Greek colonies, Ciscaucasian helmets ceased to be used by the Scythians in the 6th century BCE, and were replaced by Greek ones, especially of the Attic type, while the female burial of the 2nd Kelermes kurgan contained an Ionian Greek silver gilt mirror made in the 7th to 6th centuries BCE.

==== Pontic Scythian political and social formation ====
Within the Pontic Steppe, the incoming Iranic Scythians settled in the eastern steppe regions on the western and eastern banks of the Hypanis and Borysthenēs rivers and immediately to the north of the Maeotian Sea eastwards until the Tanais river, while in the western parts of the Scythian kingdom lived several Thracian and Proto-Slavic sedentary tribes: the arriving Scythian conquerors established themselves as the ruling elite, known as the Royal Scythians, over the local population and assimilated them into a single tribal identity while allowing them to continue their various lifestyles and economic organisations.

Thus, in many parts of the north Pontic region under their rule, the Scythians established themselves as a ruling class over already present sedentary Thracian populations in the western regions: some of the Scythian tribes intermarried with the already present sedentary Thracian populations to form new tribes such as the Nomadic Scythians and the Alazones, composed of a Thracian populace with an Iranic ruling class. The Royal Scythians' ability to dominate these sedentary populations was itself derived from their nomadic military methods which they had first developed in Ciscaucasia. Therefore, many of the ethnically non-Scythian populations of the Pontic Steppe became designated by the term "Scythians" largely because they lived under the domination of the Scythians proper, after whom the Pontic Steppe also became known as Scythia.

During this early phase of the Pontic Scythian kingdom, the Royal Scythians settled in the region immediately to the west of the Tanais river, with their hold on the western part of the steppe located to the west of the Borysthenēs being light, and they were largely satisfied with tribute they levied from the sedentary agriculturist populations of this region.

In the Tauric Chersonese, where lived the Tauri, the Royal Scythians conquered the members of this population living in the foothills and the steppes, thus gaining control of mist of the peninsula and forming a mixed Scythi-Taurian population. Due to this mingling with the Scythians, the sites of the Taurian Kizil-Koba culture in the foothill steppes were different from those in the Tauric Mountains who remained independent of the Scythians. During the 6th century BCE, the Scythians were few in number in the Tauric Chersonese, and, because they led a nomadic life, their population on the peninsula increased only during the seasonal migrations.

From the 7th to 5th centuries BCE, the Scythian kingdom was a pre-state tribal class society constituted of tribes headed by their own lords, with the king being the main tribal lord of the dominant tribe of the incoming Iranic Scythians, known as the Royal Scythians, and all the other tribes within the Scythian kingdom being subject to the Royal Scythians, to whose king and warrior aristocracy they had to provide servants to.

The metallurgical workshops which produced the weapons and horse harnesses of the Scythians during the Early Scythian period were located in the forest steppe, with the centre of industry at that time being located in the region of the Tiasmyn group of the Scythian culture, which corresponded the country of the Arotēres, where an Iranic Scythian elite ruled over a sedentary Thracian population.

During this early phase of their northern Pontic kingdom, in the 6th to 5th centuries BCE, the Scythian royalty would bury their dead in two main regions:

- in Ciscaucasia in the Kuban region inhabited by the Maeotians, where the royal and aristocratic tombs were the most lavish of all Scythian funerary monuments of the Early Scythian period, and included the kurgans of Kelermesskaya, Ulsky Aul, and Kostromskaya Stanitsa. The burials in these kurgans consisted either of rectangular or square pits covered with wood, or of wooden or stone vaults built on the ground surface, in which the deceased were laid out in supine position, accompanied by riding horses, as well as draught horses accompanied by chariots and several objects of West Asian origin;
- in the forest steppe, where the tombs were built using a slightly different rite than the Ciscaucasian ones: they consisted of pits covered with wood or wooden vaults built on the ground surface or let into pits, with the vaults having occasionally been burnt before being covered by the earthen mound. Of these, the most important was the Melhuniv kurgan, which contained grave goods of West Asian origin comparable to those of the Ciscaucasian tombs.

Only a very small number, about 20, of Scythian tombs from the 6th to 5th centuries BCE were in the Pontic Steppe: these burial patterns followed a custom whereby the Scythian royalty buried their dead at the edges of their territory so as to mark the boundaries of their kingdom.

==== Scythian influence in the Pontic Steppe ====
The westward migration of the Scythians was accompanied by the introduction into the north Pontic region of articles originating in the Siberian Karasuk culture, such as distinctive swords and daggers, and which were characteristic of Early Scythian archaeological culture, consisting of cast bronze cauldrons, daggers, swords, and horse harnesses, which had themselves been influenced by Chinese art, with, for example, the "cruciform tubes" used to fix strap-crossings being of types which had initially been modelled by Shang artisans.

It was at this time that the Scythians brought the knowledge of working iron which they had acquired in West Asia with them and introduced it into the Pontic Steppe, whose peoples were still Bronze Age societies until then. Some West Asian blacksmiths might also have accompanied the Scythians during their northwards retreat and become employed by Scythian kings, after which the practice of ironworking soon spread to the neighbouring populations.

The Scythian establishment in the Pontic Steppe, and therefore their subduing of the native populations of this region, was especially facilitated by the iron weapons and the military experience they had obtained in West Asia. Introduced into the Pontic Steppe during this period by the Scythians was the use of scale armour, which the Royal Scythian aristocracy had themselves borrowed from West Asian peoples.

==== Expansion into Central Europe ====
===== Migration of the Sindi =====
As part of the Scythians' expansion into Europe, a section of the Scythian tribe of the Sindi left the region of the Maeotian Sea and, over the course of the 7th to 6th centuries BCE, migrated westwards into the eastern section of the Pannonian Steppe, where they settled alongside the Sigynnae.

The majority of the Sindi instead remained in Ciscaucasia, where they settled on the peninsula which came to be known as the Sindic Chersonese (Ancient Greek: Σινδική χερσόνησος, romanized: Sindikḗ khersónēsos) after them, and where they formed a ruling class over the native Maeotians, who were themselves of native Caucasian origin.

===== In the forest steppe =====
The presence of Scythian aristocratic burials in the forest steppe suggests that the Scythian kingdom in the 6th BCE century was still continuing its policy of trying to establish its authority on the native populations of the forest steppe, as also attested by the how these latter populations were still building fortified settlements to defend themselves from Scythian attacks.

The Scythians were able to expand their hegemony into part of the forest steppe situated to the east of the Borysthenēs river over the course of the late 7th and early 6th centuries BCE, soon after the end of their activities in West Asia, but they were only starting to enter the parts of the forest steppe to the west of the Borysthenēs at this time.

Once the Royal Scythians had moved from Ciscaucasia into the Pontic Steppe in the late 7th century BCE and they had subjugated the eastern forest steppe, they collaborated closely with the ruling elites of the forest steppe tribes. During the 6th century BCE, this dependency of the forest steppe sedentary population consisted of tribute-offering, in exchange of which the Scythians would avoid launching military raids against them and would let the local rulers preserve their political organisation and preside over the production of agricultural produce to be given as tribute to the Scythians.

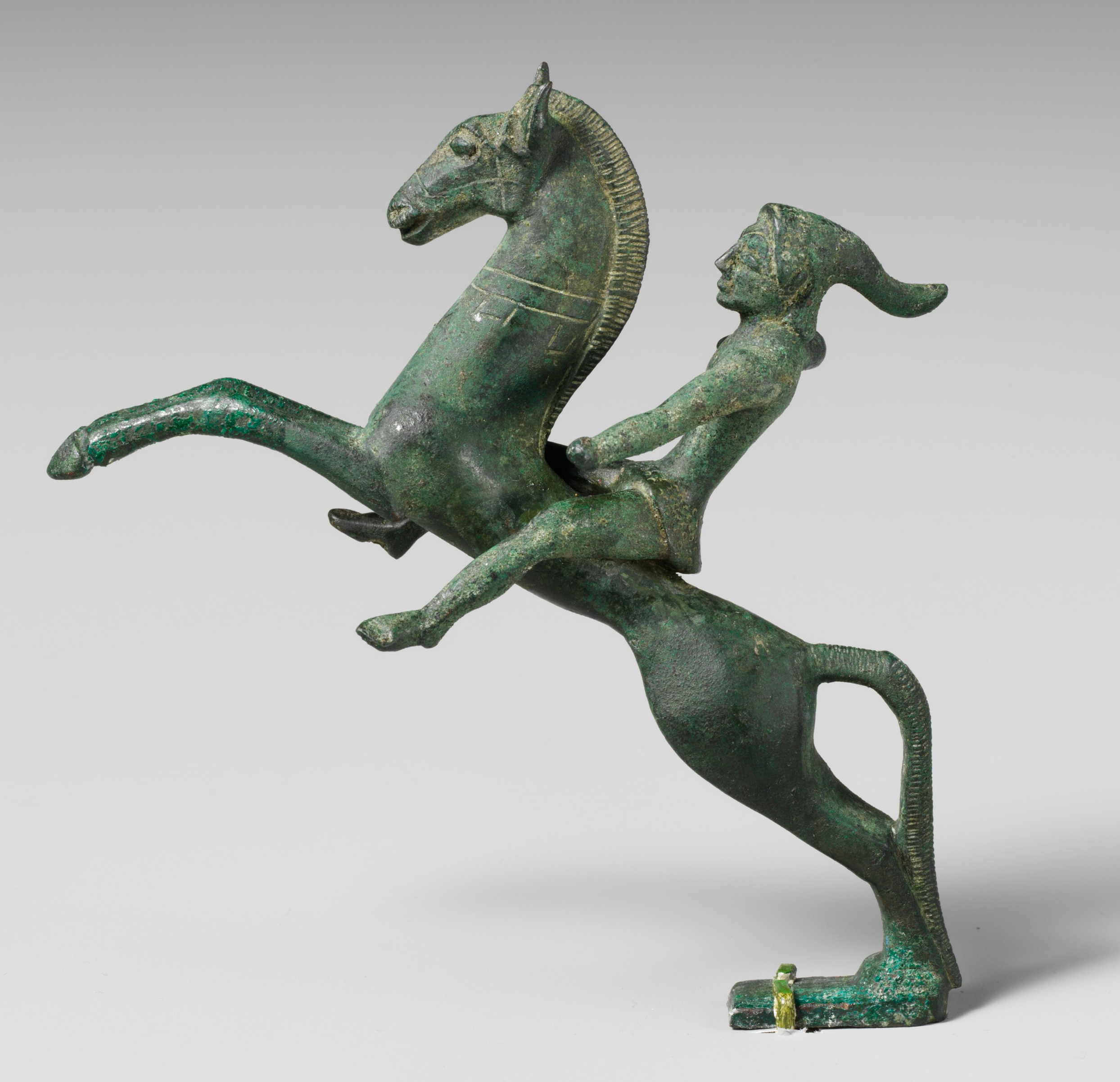
Scythian mounted archer, Etruscan art, early 5th century BCE.

===== Raids to the west =====
Once the centre of Scythian power had shifted into the Pontic Steppe, from around c. 600 BCE the Scythians often raided into the adjacent regions, with Central and Southeast Europe being a frequent target of their attacks. Attacks by the Scythians were directed not only at Transylvania, Podolia and the Pannonian Steppe, but might also have been directed at southern Germania, where they attacked the Lusatian culture and caused its destruction, and from there, until as far as Gaul, and possibly even the Iberian peninsula: these Scythian incursions were not unlike those of the Huns and the Avars during the Migration Period, and of the Mongols in the mediaeval era, and were recorded in Etruscan bronze figurines depicting mounted Scythian archers.

Multiple settlements of the Lusatian culture were destroyed by Scythian attacks during this period, and Scythian arrowheads have been found at several sites located in what are present-day Poland and Slovakia, such as at Witaszkowo, Wicina, Strzegom, Polanowice, and Smolenice-Molpír. The Scythians also attacked, sacked and destroyed many of the wealthy and important Iron Age settlements located to the north and south of the Moravian Gate and belonging to the eastern group of the Hallstatt culture, including that of Smolenice-Molpír, where Scythian-type arrows were found at this fortified hillfort's access points at the gate and the south-west side of the acropolis

===== Westwards Scythian influences =====
Due to these Scythian incursions, new early Scythian-type objects originating from the steppes, consisting of Scythian-type weapons and horse-equipment, as well as remains associated with the early Scythians, started appearing from this time in Central Europe especially in Bessarabia, Transylvania, the Thracian and Pannonian plains, and what is presently Slovakia. Trade and the migration of some Scythian splinter groups into the Pannonian Basin also contributed to the appearance of these Scythian-type objects there.

Some of the populations of the Lusatian culture, as well as the eastern groups of the Hallstatt culture, might also have been influenced by the Scythians and therefore borrowed weapon and horse harness types from them: interactions with the Scythians led to the adoption of the Scythian-type "Animal Style" art and mounted archery by the population of these regions in the subsequent period. It was also at this time that the Scythians introduced metalwork types which followed Shang Chinese models into Western Eurasia, where they were adopted by the Hallstatt culture. Scythian artistic influences were also absorbed by Celtic art at this time.

Trade between the Pontic Scythian kingdom and the nomads of the Pannonian Basin as well as the migration of splinter Scythian groups there contributed to the transformation of the culture of these peoples into a more Scythian-like form. Among the populations influenced were the Agathyrsi of Transylvania and the Sigynnae of the north and northwest Pannonian Basin: after the Sigynnae had settled into the Pannonian Steppe in the 8th century BCE, their originally Chernogorovka-Novocherkassk culture evolved into the Mezőcsát group, which itself evolved into the Vekerzug culture after coming under Scythian influence.

==== Second wave of Greek colonisation ====
The establishment of the Pontic Scythian kingdom was a catalyst for the development of extensive trade connections, and it was only after the bulk of the Scythians had moved into the Pontic Steppe that more permanent Greek colonies were founded in this region: the second wave of Greek colonisation of the north coast of the Black Sea, which started soon after c. 600 BCE, involved the formation of settlements possessing agricultural lands (Ancient Greek: χῶραι, romanized: khôrai) for migrants from Miletus, Corinth, Phocaea and Megara seeking to establishing themselves to farm (Ancient Greek: ἀποικίαι, romanized: apoikíai) in these regions where the land was fertile and the sea was plentiful.

The relations between the Scythian kingdom and the Greek colonies of the northern Pontic region were therefore initially largely peaceful, owing to which the Greek cities possessed no defensive walls and were surrounded by unfortified rural khōrai in which were produced the grain that was consumed in the cities or exported. The prosperity of these new Greek cities depended more on the agricultural production of their khōrai than on trade transiting through them being largely located on the coasts of the Tauric Chersonese.

However, the areas most especially favoured by this wave of colonisation were the Trachean and Sindic Chersoneses, which not only controlled the passage through the Cimmerian Bosporus linking the Black Sea to the Maeotian Sea and therefore also provided access to the rivers flowing into it, but also because of the large numbers of fish thriving in the nutrient-rich waters of the Maeotian Sea. The Cimmerian Bosporus was thus so particularly attractive for the Greek settlers that about nine new colonies were founded on both the Trachean and Sindic Chersoneses over the course of c. 580 to c. 560 BCE, including Krēmnoi on the Maeotian Sea near the estuary of the Tanais river, and later at Pantikapaion, followed by more places, so that about a dozen Greek colonies were soon located around the Cimmerian Bosporus. All of these colonies on the Cimmerian Bosporus were port cities, with the settlement of Pantikapaion, which directly overlooked the strait, being the most important of them.

Among these Greek colonies, the most prominent ones would be Pontic Olbia, which served the demands of the Scythian aristocracy of the Borysthenēs river valley, and Pantikapaion, who supplied the Scythian aristocrats in the Tauric and Sindic Chersoneses.

Pontic Olbia was one of the most important cities founded during this second wave of colonisation, and was located on the mainland next to the emporion of Borysthenēs. The emporion itself was soon moved to Olbia due to the poor quality of the port facilities of the island of Borysthenēs, leading to Olbia soon overshadowing the colony Borysthenēs to instead itself become an important cultural and commercial centre.

In the Pontic Steppe, the Greek colonists also found appealing opportunities to trade with the Scythians by selling them wine, olive oil, textiles, metal vessels, high quality ceramic, and luxury goods in exchange for furs, raw materials, fish, animal products, slaves, and grains: Pontic Olbia especially supplied the Scythians with luxury goods such as personal ornaments, gold and silver vases, glyptic, wine, and oil, as well as defensive and offensive weapons produced in workshops located in Olbia itself or imported from mainland Greece. Olbia's main commercial partner in Greece during this period was the city-state of Athens; during the 6th century BCE Olbia was also importing large amounts of painted ware from Rhodes, Samos, Corinth, and Ionia, as well as wine in amphorae from Chios and Thasos, and bronze objects such as tools and mirrors, which were all sold to the Scythians, who especially bought Corinthian and Athenian pottery.

An important gold trade route also connected Pontic Olbia with the inland areas, running north into the territory of the tribe of the Arotēres, and from there leading into inner Asia: the Greek cities were able to grow and thrive quickly because they had been able to develop extensive trade relations with distant regions thanks to the rule of the Scythian kingdom over the Pontic Steppe and of its kings' establishment of a Pax Scythica which ensured that traders were safe from robbers. This thriving trade route in turn was an important source of profits for the Scythian royalty and aristocracy thanks to which they obtained significant wealth. The relations between the Scythian kingdom and the Greek traders were therefore mutually beneficial and influenced both the nomadic Scythians and the forest steppe populations, with the Scythian aristocracy profiting significantly from this trade.

Olbia especially maintained friendly relations with the surrounding populations at this time, especially with the Arotēres, with whom it had close connections.

Another factor which forced the Greek colonists to maintained friendly commercial, economic and political relations with the Scythians was the fear of possible Scythian attacks, in which case the Greek fortifications would not be able to withstand the attacks of the strong and large Scythian army. Therefore, the Greeks of the Pontic coast sent rich gifts to the Scythian kings and petty lords as tribute in exchange of their neutrality or even support. Scythian aristocracy reciprocated the Greek cities' amicable attitude by adopting the same friendly policy towards the Greek cities.

The contacts between the Scythians and the Greeks led to the formation of a mixed Graeco-Scythian culture, such as among the "Hellenised Scythian" tribe of the Callipidae, the Histrians, the Geloni to the north of Scythia, and the Hellenised populations in and around Crimea.

==== Rise of the Persian Empire ====
Meanwhile, in West Asia, the Median, Lydian, and Neo-Babylonian empires which the Scythians had interacted with during their stay to the south of the Caucasus Mountains had been replaced over the period of c. 550 to c. 539 BCE by the Achaemenid Empire, founded by Cyrus II, the king of the Persians, who were a West Asian Iranic people distantly related to the Scythians.

The society of the Achaemenid Empire under Cyrus II and his earlier successors at this time still preserved many aspects of the earlier common Iranic culture which they shared in common with the Scythians.

The formation of the Persian Achaemenid Empire constituted a further pressure from the south which forced the Scythians to remain to the north of the Caucasus and of the Black Sea. Like during the 8th to 7th centuries BCE, however, influences from Achaemenid-ruled West Asia would flow northwards across the Caucasus Mountains and would influence Scythian culture.

==== Third wave of Greek colonisation ====
In c. 547 BCE, Cyrus II had conquered the Lydian Empire and brought Anatolia under the rule of his newly founded Persian Achaemenid Empire, consequently setting in march a large outflow of Greek refugees fleeing the Persian conquest, of whom many fled to the north coast of the Black Sea, thus in turn starting a third wave of Greek colonisation of this region, lasting from around c. 560 BCE until c. 530 BCE.

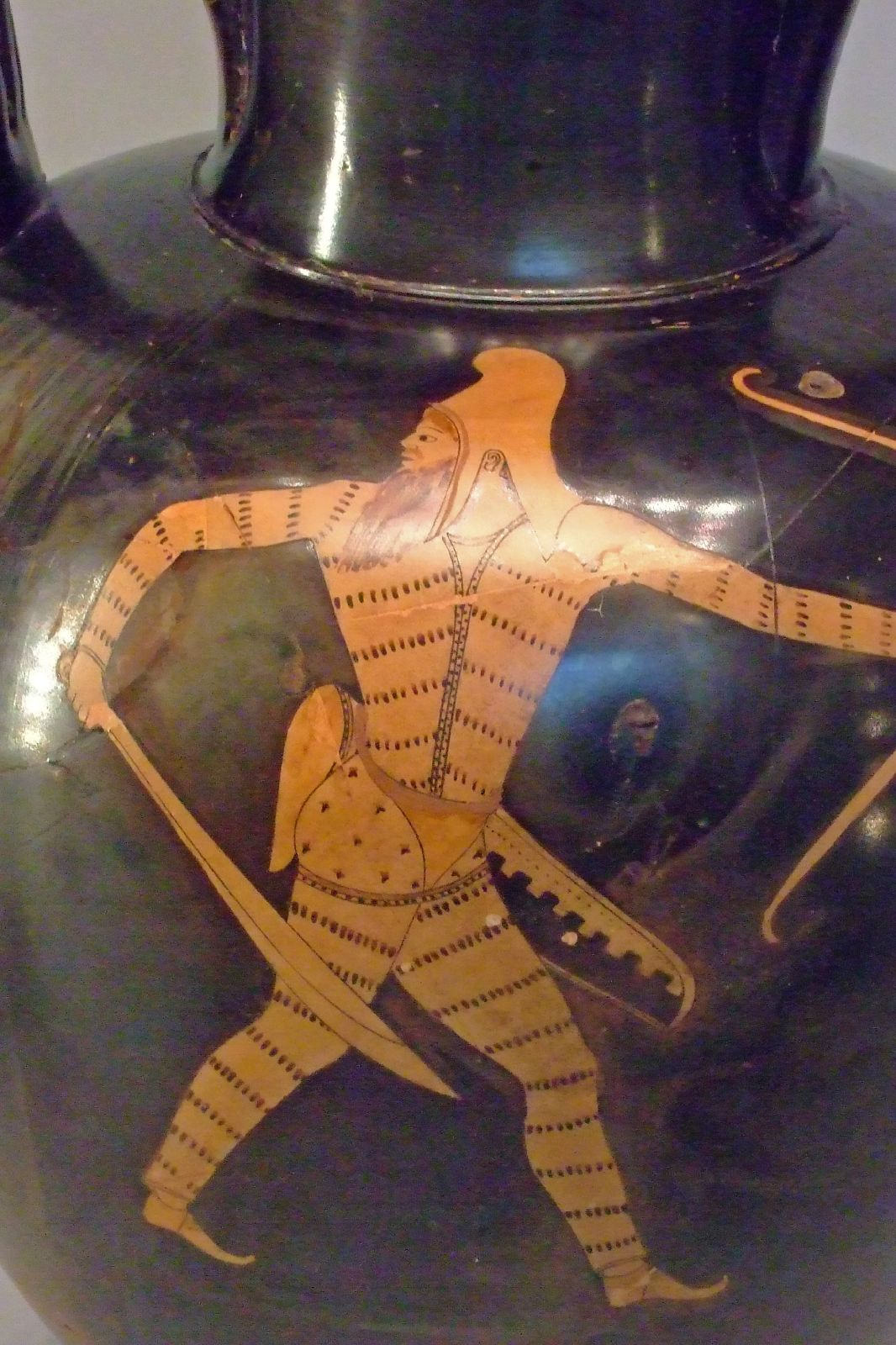
Red-figured amphora with a Scythian warrior, 480-470 BCE, from Athens

Although the Greek cities of the Aegean Sea were still founding new colonies throughout all the coasts of the Black Sea, some of the already existing colonies were also starting to set up their own colonies, leading to the growth of the Greek migrant population in all of these settlements. This third wave of colonisation was complex, as attested by how the settlement of Chersonesus in the Tauric Chersonese was founded in the later 6th century BCE, but would later be re-settled by colonists from Pontic Heracleia in the 5th century BCE.

The importance of the Greek colonies of the north Black Sea coast drastically increased following the Persian Achaemenid Empire's conquest of Egypt in 525 BCE by Cambyses II, son of Cyrus II, which deprived the states of Greece proper of the Egyptian grain that they depended on.

These grain supplies were so important to the city-states of Greece, most especially of the then dominant Greek power of Athens, that this latter city started seeking new locations for producing grain on the north shore of the Black Sea. Therefore, Athens established very well defended new colonies on the north Black Sea coast near the already existing settlements, including Nymphaion near Pantikapaion, Athēnaion near Theodosia, and Stratokleia near Phanagoreia, which would act as sites where grain of very good quality was produced to be exported to Athens to feed its citizenry.

The various Greek city-states of the Aegean Sea also imported fish, furs and slaves from Scythia during this period, and in the mid-6th century BCE the Greeks started employing Scythian mercenaries in the form of detachments of mounted archers to support their own hoplite armies.

The relations between the Greeks and the Scythians continued remaining largely peaceful during the later 6th century BCE, although the only Greek colony in the region of the lower Tanais river, Krēmnoi, was destroyed by the Scythians between c. 550 and c. 525 BCE, and Pantikapaion might have been destroyed by the Scythians around c. 550 BCE.

==== First wave of Sauromatian immigration ====
To the east of the Scythian kingdom across the Tanais lived the Sauromatians, who were an Iranic tribe closely related to the Scythians, and who were organised into a single tribal confederation. This Sauromatian kingdom maintained good relations with the Scythian kingdom throughout its existence, from the 6th to 4th centuries BCE, thanks to which there existed a trade route starting in Scythia and reaching eastwards through the territory of the Sauromatians, with Scythian art in the middle Tanais river region exhibiting influences from the Sauromatian culture and, to a lesser degree, from the Ananyino culture.

However, in the period from c. 550 to c. 500 BCE, the various Sauromatian communities living from the region stretching from the Ural Mountains to the Caspian Steppe came pressure from the Massagetae of Central Asia as a result of the campaigns of Cyrus II against this latter people. Due to these pressures, the Sauromatians from the territory of the Araxes Steppe in the east over the course of the 6th century BCE took over the control of Ciscaucasia from the Scythian kingdom, beginning with the territory to the east of the river Laba, and then the whole Kuban valley.

By the end of the 6th century BCE, the Scythians had lost their territories in the Kuban Steppe to the Sauromatians, and the Scythian earthworks in this region were abandoned, except for those in its westernmost part which included the Sindic Chersonese, where the Scythian Sindi tribe formed a ruling class over the native Maeotians independently of the bulk of the Scythians in the Pontic Steppe, due to which this country was named Sindica. By the 5th century BCE, the Scythians had completely retreated from Ciscaucasia, and Sindica was the only part of this region where the Scythian culture still survived.

This process resulted in a wave of Sauromatian nomads crossing the Tanais river, immigrating into Scythia, settling near the Royal Scythians in the region of the Maeotian Sea on the right bank of the Tanais up to the Borysthenēs, and intermarrying with the local nomad inhabitants of the Pontic Steppe. The arrival of this wave of Sauromatian immigration destroyed several settlements in the river valleys of the Borysthenēs and of the other rivers of Scythia, and it might possibly have caused the replacement of the older Scythian ruling dynasty of Spargapeithes by a new one, founded by Ariapeithes.

Introduced in Scythia by the Sauromatian immigrants in the late 6th century BCE was a new funerary rite, where the deceased were inhumated in "catacombs" made of one or more burial chambers branching from a vertical entrance well. These "catacomb" burials would become more commonly used for aristocratic burials in the 5th and 4th centuries BCE. Scythian art from soon after this time also reflected influences from Central Asian and Siberian tradition.

This Sauromatian immigration also introduced new social norms into Scythia thanks to which women were now allowed to become warriors. Thus, the graves of Scythian women from this period and later contained the burials of armed women, mostly belonging to ordinary nomads, and more rarely to richer nomads, with 37% of Scythian women's burials containing the graves of armed women. The grave goods of these tombs reflected influences from the east, such as bronze daggers characteristic of the Tagar culture, as well as human individuals with East Asian features, and one deceased woman was buried in a grave whose location corresponds to present-day Novosilka near Lypovets along with a Central Asian camel.

==== Anacharsis ====
The famous Scythian sage Anacharsis came from the Scythian royal dynasty in the 6th century BCE, being the brother of the then reigning king Sauaios, and both Anacharsis and Sauaios being the sons of the preceding Scythian king Gnouros.

Some time in the late 6th century BCE, Anacharsis left Scythia to travel to Greece, where he became respected enough as a skilled philosopher that he was granted Athenian citizenship. According to Herodotus of Halicarnassus, Anacharsis was shot with an arrow by his brother the king Sauaios as punishment for having performed a sacrifice to the Mother of the Gods in the wooded country of Hylaia, where was located an altar to this goddess.

Although much regarding the historicity of Anacharsis is uncertain, he later became popular in ancient Greek literature, in which he appeared as a sort of "man of Nature" and "noble savage" incarnating "Barbarian wisdom," after which he especially a favourite figure of the Cynics.

At this time, the Scythians were ruled by a triple-monarchy, with the names of the kings Skōpasis, Taxakis, and Sauaios's son Idanthyrsus, being recorded for the late 6th century BCE.

==== The Persian invasion ====
Map of the Scythian campaign of Darius I.

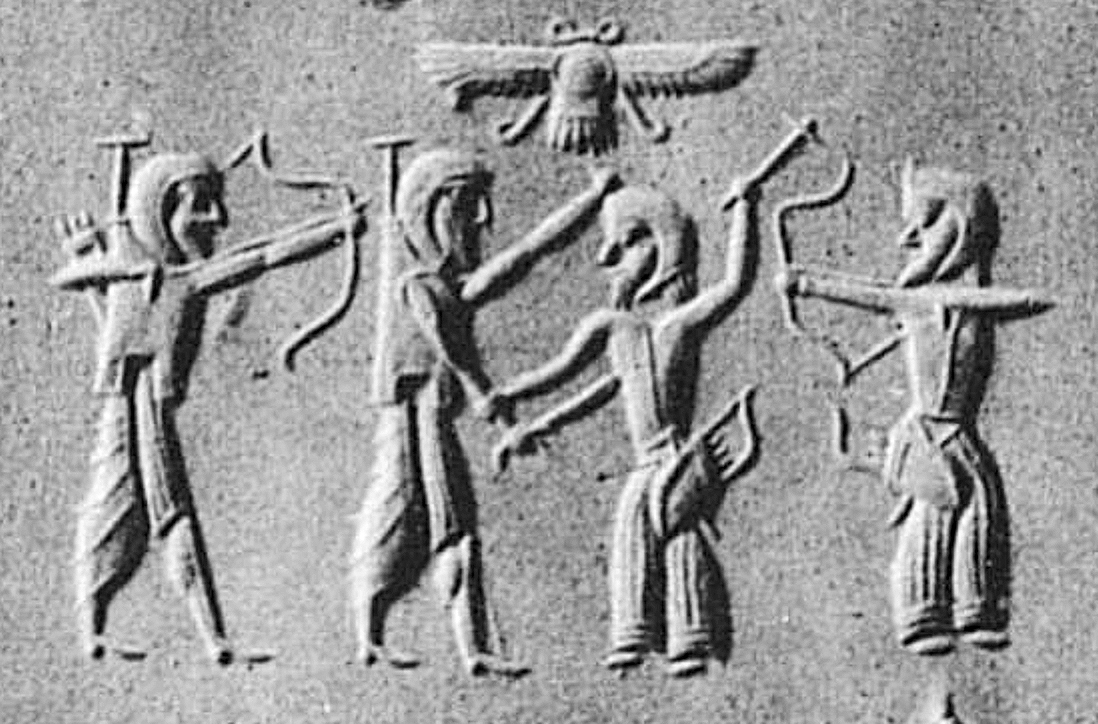
Persian soldiers (left) fighting against Scythians. Cylinder seal impression.

In the late 6th century BCE, the Achaemenid Persian Empire started expanding into Europe, beginning with the Persian annexation of all of Thrace, after which the Achaemenid king of kings Darius I crossed the Istros river in 513 BCE and attacked the Scythian kingdom with an army of 700,000 to 800,000 soldiers, possibly with the goal of annexing it.

In response, the Scythian king Idanthyrsus summoned the kings of the peoples surrounding his kingdom to a council to decide how to deal with the Persian invasion. The Budini, Geloni and Sauromatians joined the Scythian-led alliance in resisting the Persian invasion, and Idanthyrsus led the joint forces of the Scythians and their allied neighbours in resisting the Persian invasion. Meanwhile, the Agathyrsi, Androphagi, Melanchlaeni, Neuri and Tauri refused to support the Scythians.

According to Herodotus of Halicarnassus, the Scythian-led alliance's strategy was to adopt the tactic of retreating before the Persian army and staying one day's march ahead of them instead of directly fighting them, while also employing scorched earth tactics so as to goad the Persian army deeper into the deserted parts of Scythian territory. The Persian army eventually crossed the Tanais river and built fortifications there, but the Scythians continued their tactics until the Persian army was no longer at a safe distance from the Istros, allowing the Scythians to launch guerrilla attacks on it.

The results of this campaign are unclear, with Darius I himself claiming that he had conquered the Sakā tayaiy paradraya (lit. 'the Saka who dwell beyond the (Black) Sea'), that is the Pontic Scythians, while the ancient Greek literary tradition, following the account of Herodotus of Halicarnassus, claimed that the Persian campaign had been defeated by the Scythians, due to which the Greeks started perceiving the Scythians as being invincible thanks to their nomadic lifestyle: Herodotus's narrative is itself considered dubious by modern historians, and his account of the failure of Darius appears to have been extremely exaggerated. Some form of Achaemenid authority might have been established in Pontic Scythia as a result of this campaign without it having been annexed.

According to Herodotus, soon after the Persian invasion, the Scythians sent a diplomatic mission to Sparta in Greece with the goal of establishing a military alliance against Darius I. Herodotus claims that, as a result of this embassy, the Spartans started drinking undiluted wine, which they called the "Scythian fashion" of drinking wine. The planned attack against the Achaemenid Empire however never happened.

== Middle (or Classical) Scythian period ==
The retreat of the Scythians from Ciscaucasia and the arrival of the Sauromatian incomers into the Pontic Steppe in the late 6th century BCE caused significant cultural changes in Scythia, giving rise to the Middle or Classical Scythian period, which itself was a hybrid culture originating from a combination of a continuation of the material culture reflected in the Ciscaucasian Scythian burials with Sauromatian elements.

Among the changes in Scythia in this period was a significant increase in the number of monumental burials: it was from the Middle Scythian period that the largest number of Scythian burials in the Pontic Steppe were made, with the Scythian upper classes starting to bury their dead within the Pontic Steppe itself largely in the region of the rapids of the Borysthenēs river (possibly the country of Gerrhos mentioned by Herodotus), although some aristocratic burials were also located in the forest steppes. These burials, which included horse sacrifices, were continuations of the Ciscaucasian burial traditions. Scythian burials from this period include:

- some significant sites in the region of the Borysthenēs river rapids, such as the Hostra Tomakivska mohyla, the 1st barrow of the Zavadska Mohyla, the 5th barrow of the Novohryhorivka mohyla, Baby mohyla, and Rozkopana mohyla;
- some in the Tauric Chersonese, such as the Zoloty kurhan and Kulakivsky kurhan.

=== Consolidation ===
As a result of the arrival of the Sauromatian incomers, and due to the need to resist Persian encroachment, the Scythian kingdom underwent political consolidation in the early 5th century BCE, during which it underwent the most significant of its economic, political, social, and cultural development by completing its evolution from a tribal confederation into an early state polity capable of dealing with the polities threatening or trading with it in an effective way; during this period, the Scythian kings increased their power and wealth by concentrating economic power under their authority.

It was also during this period that the control of the Scythians over the western part of their kingdom became heavier and more coercive with respect to the sedentary agricultural peoples living to the west of the Borysthenēs.

==== Expansionism ====
A consequence of this consolidation of the Scythian kingdom was an increase in its expansionism and militarism.

===== In Thrace =====
In the west, nearby Thrace became a target of Scythian expansion following the complete Achaemenid retreat from Europe, with the Scythians coming into conflict with the various Thracian peoples during the 5th century BCE, and gaining free access of the Wallachian and Moldavian Steppes while also establishing a presence to the south of the Istros river, around Kallatis and Dionysopolis.

In 496 BCE, the Scythians launched a raid until as far south as the Thracian Chersonese on the Hellespont.

The Scythians' inroads in Thrace were however soon stopped by the emergence of the Odrysian kingdom in this region, following which the Scythian and Odrysian kingdoms mutually established the Istros as their common border after concluding friendly and mutually advantageous relations with each other some time around c. 480 BCE: from then on, the contacts between the Scythians and Thracians deepened, with each borrowing from the other's art and lifestyle; marriage between the Scythian and Odrysian aristocracies were also concluded, including between their respective royal dynasties, with the Scythian king Ariapeithes marrying a daughter of the Odrysian kingdom's founding king Tērēs I some time between c. 480 and c. 460 BCE.

At some point between c. 475 and c. 460 BCE, Ariapeithes was killed by the Agathyrsian king Spargapeithes, after which he was succeeded as king by his son Scyles, whose mother was a Greek woman from Histria.

===== In Sindica =====
To the southeast, the Scythians came into conflict with their splinter tribe of the Sindi, with whom they fought by crossing the frozen Cimmerian Bosporus during the winter.

===== In the forest steppe =====
A second direction where the Scythian kingdom expanded was in the north and north-west: the Scythian kingdom had continued its attempts to impose its rule on the forest steppe peoples throughout the 7th and 6th centuries BCE, and by the 5th century BCE, it was finally able to complete the process of subjugating the groups of these populations living to the west of the Borysthenēs after destroying their fortified settlements, which were subsequently abandoned.

With the completion of the subjugation of the forest steppe by the Scythians, the various ethnic groups inhabiting this region interacted to the point that their cultures fused with that of the Scythians, leading to the originally Scythian-type burials in kurgans which had originated in Ciscaucasia becoming widespread among the forest steppe populations.

During the 5th century BCE, Scythian rule over the forest steppe people became increadingly dominating and coercive, leading to a decline of their sedentary agrarian lifestyle, especially in the region of the right bank of the Borysthenēs, where their settlements disintegrated and became fewer in number. This in turn resulted in a reduction in the importation of Greek goods by the peoples of the forest steppe in the 5th century BCE.

The presence of Scythian kurgans from the site corresponding to modern Boryspil attests that the Scythians also appear to have captured territories from the tribes of the forest steppe at this time.

===== On the Pontic coast =====
The peaceful relations which had until then prevailed between the Scythian kingdom and the Greek colonies of the northern Pontic region came to an end during the period of expansionism in the early 5th century BCE, when the Scythian kings for the first time started trying to impose their rule over the Greek colonies. In response to hostility from the Scythian kingdom, the Greek cities erected defensive installations while their khōrai were destroyed or abandoned, meaning that they lost their agricultural production base, while burials of men killed by Scythian arrows started appearing in their nekropoleis.

At the same time, because the Scythian kingdom still needed to trade with the Greeks in the lower Tanais region, in the early 5th century BCE it replaced the formerly destroyed Greek colony of Krēmnoi with a Scythian settlement for this purpose, located at the site corresponding to present-day Yelizavetovskaya in the delta of the Tanais river. The population of this 40 hectare settlement was composed mostly of Scythians and a minority community of Greek merchants, with a smaller fortified section of this city being the residence of the local Scythian aristocrats, thus putting trade in this region directly under the control of the Scythian kingdom.

The hold of the Scythian kingdom on the western part of the northern Pontic region became firmer under the reign of the king Scyles, who was successfully able to impose Scythian rule on the Greek colonies in the northwestern Pontic coastal region and western Crimea, such as Nikōnion, Tyras, Pontic Olbia, and Kerkinitis, so that Scyles was minting coins at Nikōnion while Kerkinitis was paying tribute to the Scythian kingdom.

There was consequently a considerable migration of Scythians into Pontic Olbia at this time, and Scyles himself possessed a residence in Olbia which he would visit every year. The Greek colonies of the Black Sea coast thus continued adhering to their Hellenic culture while their population was very mixed, with Scythians being active at all levels of these cities, which even attracted Scythian aristocrats. During this period Greek influences also became more significant among the Scythians, especially among the aristocracy, while the inhabitants of the cities of the north shore of the Black Sea themselves borrowed the use of Scythian bows and akīnakēs swords.

The control of Scyles over the city of Nikōnion corresponded to the period when it was a member of the Delian League, thus putting it under the simultaneous hegemony of both the Scythian kingdom and the Greek city of Athens. This, as well as the contacts established by Athens in the Tauric Chersonese during this period, allowed the Scythian kingdom to engage in indirect relations with Athens when it was at the height of its power. In consequence, a community of Scythians also lived in Athens at this time and was active at all levels of society, as attested by the presence of graves of deceased Scythians in the cemetery of the Kerameikos, where a Scythian retainer had also been buried in the grave precinct of his master.

In the region of the Cimmerian Bosporus, while the Scythian kingdom was initially able to capture Nymphaion, it was however less successful at conquering the other Greek colonies there, where around 30 cities, including Myrmēkion, Tyritakē, and Porthmeus, banded together into an alliance under the leadership of Pantikapaion, built or strengthened their city walls, and successfully defended their independence. After this, they united into the Bosporan kingdom with Pantikapaion as its capital so as to manage their trade ventures and to organise their common defence against the Scythians. The Bosporan kingdom soon became a centre of production for Scythian customers living in the steppes, and, being a significant outpost of Greek culture, it therefore influenced both the Scythians and the Sindi by contributing to the development of Scythian art and style.

Despite the conflicts between the Scythian kingdom and the Greek cities, mutually beneficial exchanges between the Scythians, Maeotians and Greeks continued, and, throughout the Pontic Steppe, Scythians and Greeks lived and died in the same communities, with the presence of Scythian burials in this city's necropolis attesting of the presence of marriages between the ruling elite of Nymphaion and the Scythian aristocracy.

==== Commercial activities ====
===== Grain trading =====
As result of these expansionist ventures, the Scythian kingdom, whose core population lived in the steppe between the forest steppe and the coastal region and therefore dominated these latter two regions, implemented an economic policy through a division of labour according to which:

- the settled populations of the forest steppe produced grain, which until then they were allowed to freely sell, but were now obliged to offer to the Scythian aristocracy as tribute;
- this grain offered in tribute was then shipped through the Borysthenēs and Hypanis rivers to Pontic Olbia, Tyras, and Nikōnion;
- these latter Greek cities, who had to specialise in trading after having lost their agricultural lands, in turn acted as trading agents by selling the grain at a profit for themselves.

The outbreak of the Peloponnesian War in Greece proper in 431 BCE to some extent further increased the importance of the Pontic Steppe in supplying grain to Greece, so that the Bosporan kingdom became the main supplier of grain to Greece, and the Scythian kingdom in turn became an important seller of grain to the Bosporan kingdom: the Scythian nomadic aristocracy thus became the main intermediary in providing to the Bosporan kingdom the grain produced from the fertile and traditionally agricultural regions of the forest steppe and obtained through cultivation within the Scythian kingdom itself.

===== Slave trading =====
In the 5th century itself, the Greek cities in the Aegean Sea had started to import slaves from Scythia immediately after the end of the Persian invasions of Greece. The Greek cities acted as slave trade hubs but did not themselves capture slaves, and instead depended on the Scythian rulers to acquire slaves for them: although Scythian society was not heavily dependent on slaves, unlike the Greeks, the Scythian aristocrats nonetheless still found it profitable to acquire slaves from their subordinate tribes or through military raids in the forest steppe, who were then brought to Pontic Olbia, where they were sold to Greek merchants.

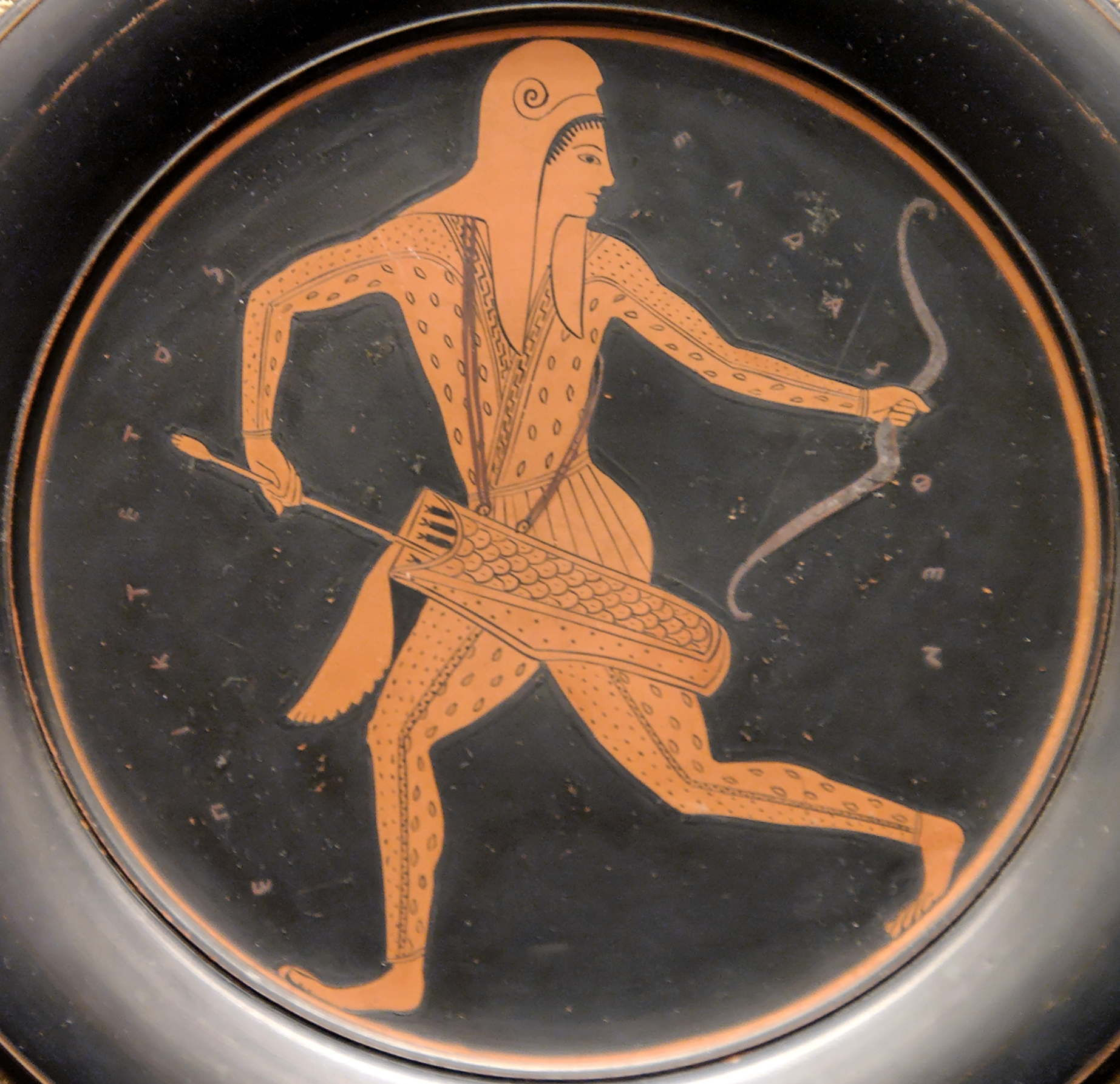
An Attic red-figure vase-painting of a Scythian archer. Epiktetos, 520–500 BCE.

Among the Scythian slaves bought by the Greeks, one particular group was bought immediately after the Battle of Salamis by the city of Athens, where they constituted an organisation of public slaves employed by the city itself as an urban police force who acted as watchmen and guards and maintained order among the general publics. These "Scythian archers" would round up unwilling citizens and kettle them to vote, could be called by the chairman of the ecclesia to remove anyone speaking for too long, and had the power to make arrests.

===== Other Scythian exports =====
In addition to slaves, the Scythians sold cattle and animal products to the Greeks.

===== Import of Greek goods =====
The Greek colonies during this time were the main suppliers of luxury goods and art to the Scythians, and Greek-type gold objects from Scythian graves of this period may thus have originated as gifts from Greek dependants or Greek families allied to Scythian aristocrats which had been offered to these aristocrats as part of complex gifting traditions used to make and secure fealty bonds or form family ties through marriage.

Trade with the Greeks especially created a thriving demand for wine in Scythia: In exchange for slaves, the Greeks sold various consumer goods to the Scythians, the most prominent among these being wine. The island of Chios in the Aegean Sea, especially, produced wine to be sold to the Scythians, in exchange of which slaves from Scythia were sold in the island's very prominent slave market.

Other commodities sold by the Greeks to the Scythians included fabrics, vessels, decorations made of precious metals, bronze items, and black burnished pottery.

===== Economic prosperity =====
Under these conditions, the grain and slave trade continued, and Pontic Olbia not only did not decline, but instead experienced economic prosperity.

The Scythian aristocracy also derived immense revenue from these commercial activities with the Greeks, most especially from the grain trade, with Scythian coins struck in Greek cities bearing the images of ears of grain. This prosperity of the Scythian aristocracy is attested by how Scythian art in this period largely celebrated the military success of the Scythian mounted warriors, as well as by how the lavish aristocratic burials progressively included more relatives, retainers, and were richly furnished with grave goods, especially imported ones, consisting of gold jewellery, silver and gold objects, including fine Greek-made toreutics, vessels and jewellery, and gold-plated weapons.

There was a very significant stratification in Scythia in terms of social and property among both the aristocratic and commoner the Scythians during this period, and Scythian commoners did not obtain any benefits from this trade, with luxury goods being absent from their tombs. That this economic success was limited to the Scythian aristocracy is reflected by how Scythian art in this period largely portrayed elements of prestige, as well as the divinisation of royal power, the cults of ancestral heroes, and celebrated military valour.

==== Greek influence ====
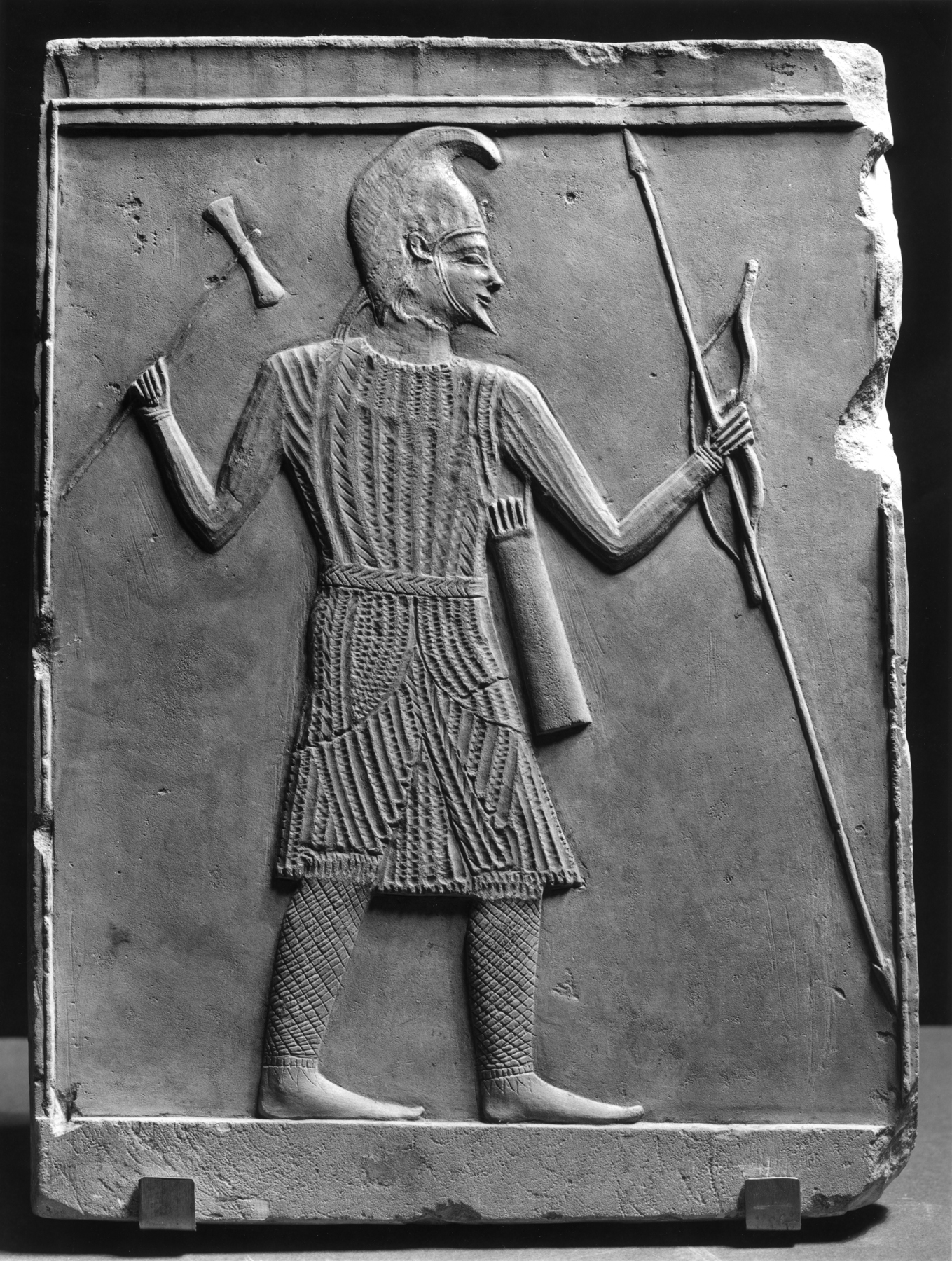
Scythian warrior with axe, bow, and spear. Possibly Greek work 4th-2nd century BCE (archaic). Marble with red paint and gold leaf

A consequence of the Scythians' close contacts with the Greek cities and of their import of Greek-manufactured art and luxury goods was that Greek art significantly influenced Scythian art and artistic preferences, in turn causing a progressive Hellenisation of the Scythian aristocracy.

The Greek supply of luxury goods in turn influenced Scythian art, so that the vegetal motifs which the Greek artisans used to decorate these goods were organically integrated into the "Animal Style" art of the Scythians and became used in works produced by both Greek and Scythian craftsmen.

Greek influence thus became a factor which shaped the evolution of Scythian weapons and horse harnesses, which were developed following Scythian norms and slowly perfected so they could be used more effectively: the Scythian composite armour, for example, was fitted with Greek-type shoulder guards in the 5th century BCE.

==== Early sedentarisation ====
Beginning the 6th century BCE, a period of deepening ties and the intensification of trade with the already sedentary Greeks led to the development of sedentary forms of economy in the more nomadic parts of the Scythian kingdom; the climate of the steppe around this time also became warmer and wetter, which caused grass which the nomads to rear their large herds of animals to grow abundance, thus allowing them to settle down in the steppe itself; these factors acted as catalysts for the process of sedentarisation of many nomadic Scythians which started during the Middle Scythian period in the late 5th century BCE.

The Scythian aristocracy, who played an important role in the grain trade and were its primary profiters, were investing in increasing the grain production within the Scythian kingdom, and therefore expanded cereal cultivations to the regions adjacent to the Bosporan kingdom through which they exported their grain, especially in the Tauric Chersonese. This policy acted as a catalyst for the intensification of the process of sedentarisation of the Scythians, especially along the reaches of the lower Borysthenēs where the terrain was propitious for agriculture.

This process of sedentarisation was especially concentrated in the eastern part of the Tauric Chersonese, near the cities of the Bosporan Kingdom, but it was also occurring elsewhere in Scythia, with several village-sites forming on the left bank of the estuary of the Tyras near Nikōnion, and nomadic Scythians who had settled down had founded along the banks of the Borysthenēs and the smaller rivers of the steppe small settlements where were cultivated large amounts of crops such as wheat, millet and barley.

Consequently, part of the nomadic Scythians were adopting a settled lifestyle during the 5th century BCE, especially along the reaches of the lower Borysthenēs where the terrain was propitious for agriculture, and where they formed small unfortified settlements. Part of the population of the khōrai of Pontic Olbia at this time was also composed of settled Scythians. The archaeological evidence suggests that the population of the Tauric Chersonese, most of whom were Scythians who had settled down to farm, during this time increased by 600%, especially in the Trachean Chersonese.

The development sedentarisation and settlement-formation finally led to the foundation in the late 5th and early 4th centuries BCE of several new city-sites: among these settlements were important city-sites located on major routes which provided access to the major rivers of Scythia, and corresponding to present-day Yelizavetovskaya at the mouth of the Tanais, Traxtemyriv on the upper Borysthenēs, Nadlymansʹke near the estuary of Tyras, Bilsk on the Vorskla river, and Kamianka at the confluence of the Borysthenēs and its tributary of the Konka river.

Despite this significant sedentarisation of the nomads, the majority of Scythians during this time and until the 3rd century BCE however still remained composed of nomads.

==== The city of Kamianka ====
Internal tribal migrations within the Scythian kingdom during the 5th century BCE appear to have caused central power to move to the region of the bend of the Borysthenēs, so that much of the Scythian settlements of the 5th and 4th centuries BCE were located in the valley of the Borysthenēs and of its tributaries until the coastal region: the site of Kamianka, located in the Borysthenēs bend region and built in the late 5th century BCE, was the largest and most important of the Scythian city-sites, measuring 12 square kilometres, and was protected by earthen ramparts, moats, the rivers and the salt lake of Bilozerka.

The "acropolis" of Kamianka was located high above the Konka river and was separated from the outer city by double-shell earthworks and a rampart topped by a Greek-style mudbrick wall. Large amounts of Greek red-figure pottery, wine amphorae, black lacquerware, krātēres for mixing wine and water, imported jewellery, and bones of game animals killed during hunts have been found in the "acropolis" of Kamianka by archaeologists, implying that it was the location of the seasonal royal Scythian headquarters; much of the goods from the "acropolis" of Kamianka, such as the Greek pottery, were Bosporan-imported, attesting of the close links between the Scythian and Bosporan kingdoms at this time.

By the Middle Scythian period, the centre of Scythian metallurgy had shifted into the steppe, in the "outer city" of Kamianka, which was considerably larger than the acropolis, and was the residence of an agriculturalist population as well as of the metalsmiths who manufactured objects from copper, lead and zinc, gold- and silverwork, such as tools, simple jewellery, as well as weapons and armour and horse trappings used by the nomadic population of the steppe. Kamianka contained several blacksmiths' workshops which were contentrated into craftsmens' quarters, with 900 hectares of the city being dedicated to industrial scale metal production.

An open tract in was also located in the southeast of the "outer city," and was perhaps used for grazing cattle, sheep and goats or for defensive purposes.

Thus, the city of Kamianka had become the economic, political and commercial capital of the Scythian kingdom in the late 5th century BCE.

==== The city of Yelizavetovskaya ====
During this period, in the 5th to early 4th centuries BCE, the site corresponding to present-day Yelizavetovskaya had become a well-fortified city where resided the local Scythian clan and tribal lords, and which functioned as the Scythian kingdom's administrative, commercial and manufacturing centre for the lower Tanais and northern Maeotian sea region.

=== Succession struggle ===
Some time around c. 440 BCE, Scyles was overthrown by his half-brother Octamasadas, who was himself the son of Ariapeithes and of the daughter of the Odrysian king Tērēs I. Scyles fled to the Odrysian kingdom, but Tērēs I's son and successor to the Odrysian kingship, Sitalkēs, met his nephew Octamasadas on the Odrysian-Scythian border on the Istros river, where Sitalkēs handed to him his half-brother Scyles, was executed by Octamasadas, while Octamasadas himself handed to Sitalkēs one of his uncles, a brother of Sitalkēs who had fled to Scythia.

Nothing is known about the third son of Ariapeithes, Oricus, other than that his mother was a Scythian woman and that he was likely the youngest son of Ariapeithes. Oricus might have even never become king, and some time after Octamasadas ousted Scyles, coins were minted in Pontic Olbia bearing the name of one Eminakos, who was either a governor of Olbia for Octamasadas or a successor of his.

==== External relations ====
As a result of the Scythian kingdom's prosperity during this period, neighbouring populations borrowed elements of Scythian culture.

===== With Central and Western Europe =====
The populations of Central and Western Europe were still borrowing from the Scythians at this time, and Scythian-type arrowheads were found in these regions.

===== With Thrace =====
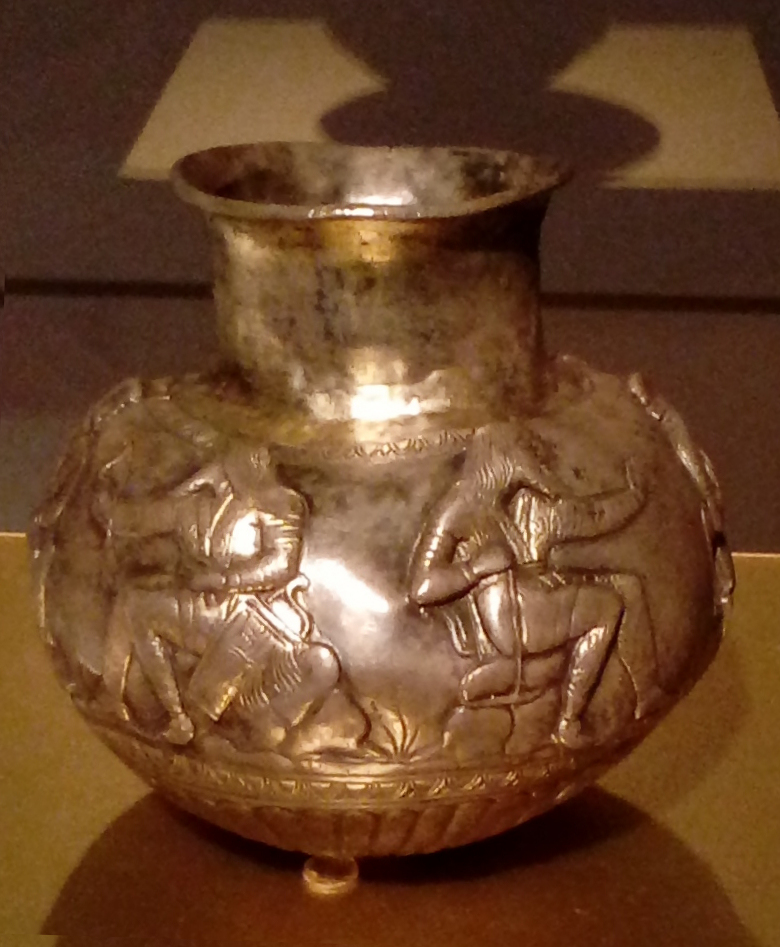
Scythian vessel from Voronež, 4th century BCE. Hermitage Museum.

Thanks to the close family connections of Octamasadas to the Thracian Odrysian dynasty through his mother, contacts between the Scythian kingdom and Odrysian-ruled Thrace intensified during the period from c. 440 to c. 400 BCE.

Significant Thracian influence consequently appeared in the grave goods of Scythian kurgans made of precious metals, with the art of Scythian bridle trappings from this period exhibiting influences from Thracian art. Thracian influence on Scythian culture was also visible in the 5th century BCE in the form of Scythian production of single-bladed swords based on Thracian battle knives which had handles and crosspieces typical of the Scythian akīnakai.

And, due to the influential position of the Scythian kingdom at this time, the Thracian Getae of the Carpathian and Balkan regions were importing large amounts of Scythian-manufactured weapons and horse equipment.

===== With the Bosporan kingdom =====
Soon after the accession of Octamasadas around c. 440 BCE, a Thracian aristocrat residing in Pantikapaion named Spartocus seized leadership of the Bosporan kingdom in c. 438 BCE, becoming the first member of the Spartocid dynasty to rule the Bosporan kingdom. with the rise of the Thracian Spartocus I being possibly connected to the assumption of the pro-Odrysian Octamasadas as king of Scythia.

These changes in the Bosporan Kingdom also led to cultural changes within it in the late 5th century BCE, so that the Greek customs which had until then been normative there gave way to more Scythian ones.

Under the Spartocid dynasty, the Bosporan kingdom would thrive and maintain stable military, political and economic relations with the Scythian kingdom which allowed it, with Scythian support, to be able expand its rule to the whole Trachean and Sindic Chersoneses and conquer several non-Greek territories on the Asian side of the Cimmerian Bosporus so that it soon covered a wide territory stretching across the whole eastern coast of the Maeotian Sea till the mouth of the Tanais river in the north.

This process transformed the Bosporan kingdom into a cosmopolitan realm whose populations consisted of Greeks descended not only from the original settlers in the region as well as more recently arrived Athenian colonists, but also of Hellenised Thracians; members of this population in turn intermarried with Scythians from the Tauric Chersonese and Sauromatians living to the east of the Tanais river, which further added to the ethnic diversity of the Bosporan Kingdom.

It was then that Pontic Olbia started declining, partly due to the instability within the Scythian steppe to its north, but also because most of the trade, including the grain exports of the Scythian kingdom, passing through Olbia until then shifted to transiting through the cities of the Cimmerian Bosporus constiting the Bosporan Kingdom at this time.

The Scythians instead started importing ornaments, expensive weapons, horse harness decorations, cultic vessels made of previous metals, and pottery mostly manufactured in Pantikapaion in the Bosporan kingdom, and much of the grave goods, such as finely decorated vases, rhyta, toreutics, headgear and footwear for the Scythian aristocracy, jewellery, and decorative plaques for gōrytoi and to decorate clothing, had been made in Bosporan Greek workshops, whose products thus replaced Olbian ones.

Thus, while Pontic Olbia was slowly declining, the trade between the Scythian and Bosporan kingdom continued to thrive, with the cities of the Cimmerian Bosporus being the main transit point through which Pontic Scythia was importing luxury goods from Thrace and fine tableware and wine from Greece, and where were located the workshops of the Greek craftsmen who produced luxurious goldwork for the new Scythian aristocracy.

Around that same time, Athenian commercial influence in the Bosporan Kingdom started declining, and, despite Athens sending someone as renowned as Pericles to negotiate, its influence in the Bosporan Kingdom had fully come to an end by the time that it had lost the Peloponnesian War in 404 BCE.

===== With Athens =====
However, following Athens's defeat in the Peloponnesian War, the Greeks living on the north shore of the Black Sea started buying more grain from the Scythians to export to Athens to end the food shortage there, resulting in the growth of trade with the Greek cities of the northern Black Sea.

==== Second wave of Sauromatian immigration ====
With the pressure of groups of the Massagetae moving into the countries of the Sauromatians in the regions between the Ural Mountains and the Tanais river continuing, sometime between c. 430 and c. 400 BCE, a second wave of migration of Sauromatians from the Araxes Steppe entered Scythia, where these newcomers intermarried with the Scythian tribes already present there after which they may possibly have established themselves as the new ruling aristocracy of the Scythian kingdom.

The Royal Scythians might possibly left the Borysthenēs river valley under pressure from the new Sauromatian incomers and moved to the west, where they consolidated themselves on the coastal area to the west of the Hypanis river, and established their new headquarters in the northwestmost part of Thracian coast located immediately to the south of the Istros river. The sedentary communities of the forest steppe also came under pressure from this new wave of nomadic incomers.

==== Period of instability ====
The immigration into Scythia of the new wave of Sauromatian arrivants as well as the internal conflicts among the Scythians themselves, caused a temporary destabilisation of the Scythian kingdom which caused it to lose control of the Greek cities on the north shores of the Black Sea. Thus, the Greek colonies no longer faced any military threats from the Scythians, as evidenced by how Pontic Olbia, Nikōnion, and Tyras started to not only rebuild their khōrai, but even expanded them during the late 5th and early 4th centuries BCE. It was also at this time that the Scythian kingdom lost control over Nymphaion, which was annexed by the Bosporan kingdom, which had itself been expanding its territories on the Asian side of the Cimmerian Bosporus.

The second wave of Sauromatian immigration had however also brought an end to the earlier trade routes of Scythia linking Olbia to the rich region of the middle Borysthenēs river where were located the markets it served, thus reducing its influence to a small coastal area between the Tyras and Borysthenēs rivers and initiating a period of slow decline for this city.

=== Golden Age ===
The period of instability ended soon, and Scythian culture experienced a period of prosperity during the 4th century BCE, which was an unusually calm period in the broader Pontic and Danubian regions.

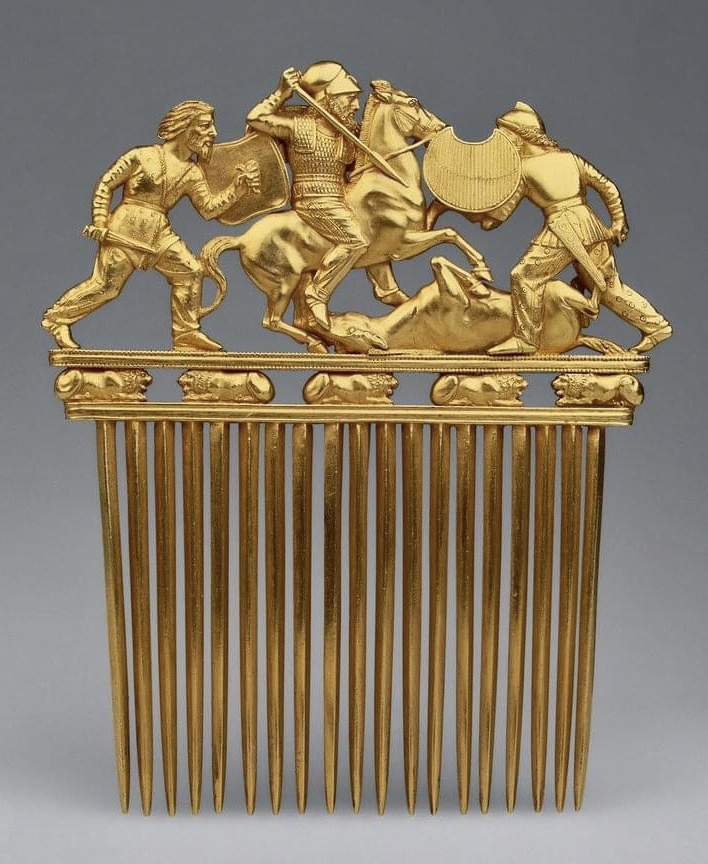
Scythian gold comb from Solokha, early 4th century BCE

About 3,000 Scythian funerary monuments from the 4th century BCE, and, out of those 2,300 already excavated by archaeologists in the 1980s, nearly 2,000 dated from this period while a smaller number dated from the preceding 5th century BCE: with most Scythian monuments and the richest Scythian royal burials dating from this period, as exemplified by the lavish Čortomlyk mohyla.

Most of the Scythian royal tombs of the 5th and 4th centuries BCE were largely located in the country of Gerrhos, which corresponds to Borysthenēs river valley within a 45 kilometre wide radius from the river's rapids that prevent further northwards navigation on the river. It is from the 4th century BCE itself that can be dated two of the most lavishly furnished groups of Scythian burials in the region of the Borysthenēs rapids:

- the "royal" burials, which were the richest group, consisted of the Solokha mohyla, Velyka Cymbalka, Čortomlyk mohyla, Ohuz mohyla, Oleksandropil, and Kozel mohyla;
- the "aristocratic" burials were the second richest group, and included the Berdyansky kurhan, Tovsta, Čmyreva mohyla, 8th barrow of the Five Brothers kurgan, Melytopolsky kurhan, Zhovtokamianka, and Krasnokutsky kurhan;
- in addition to these, several Scythian burials were also present in the territories of the Greek colonies of the north shore of the Black Sea, such as several rich tombs from the necropolis of Nymphaion, and the very lavish Kul-Oba kurgan near Pantikapaion.

==== Trade with the Greeks ====
This height of Scythian power corresponded to a time of unprecedented prosperity for the Greek colonies of the northern Black Sea, with whom the relations of the Scythian kingdom remained peaceful during this period: there was high demand for the Greek cities' trade goods, grains, slaves, and fish, thanks to which the relations between the Pontic and Aegean regions, especially with Athens, were flourishing.

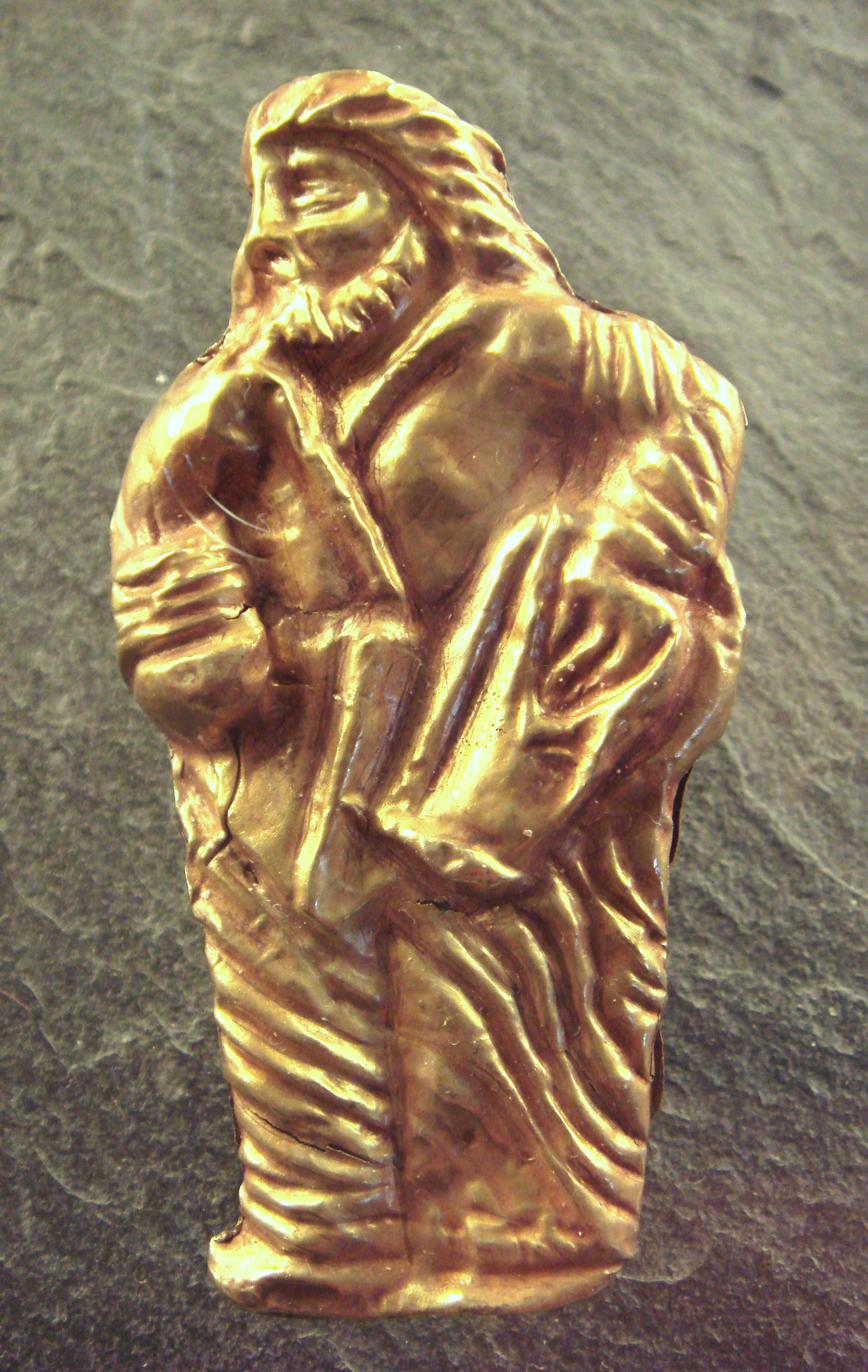
Scythian warrior, from Kul-Oba.

Although the Greek cities of the coast extended their territories considerably at this time, this did not infringe on the Scythians, who still possessed abundant pastures and whose settlements were still thriving. A large number of the toreutics used by the Scythians themselves as aristocratic and royal grave goods were during this period being made by Greek craftsmen, attesting of the strong Greek influence that the Scythians were then coming under and of the increasingly pronounced Hellenisation of the Scythian upper classes. Consequently, Scythian culture, especially that of the aristocracy, experienced rapidly-occurring extensive Hellenisation as a result of these extensive contacts with the Greek colonies on the Black Sea shore in the 4th century BCE.

===== Scytho-Bosporan relations =====
The rule of the Spartocid dynasty in the Bosporan Kingdom under the kings Leukon I, Spartocus II and Pairisadēs I was also favourable for the Scythian kingdom because they provided stability which allowed both the Scythian and Bosporan kingdoms to flourish. Leukon employed Scythians in his army, and he was able to capture Theodosia with the help of Scythian horse cavalry, which he claimed to trust more than his own army.

Extensive contacts existed between the Scythian and Bosporan nobilities, possibly including dynastic marriages between the Scythian and Bosporan royalty: the rich burial of Kul-Oba belonged to one such Scythian noble who had close family ties to a member of the Bosporan aristocracy or even the ruling Spartocid dynasty, and who therefore chose to be buried at Kul-Oba following Scythian rites in a Greek-style tomb carved from stone.

During this time, and with the support of the Scythian kings, the sedentarised Scythian farmers sold large amounts of grain reaching up to 16,000 tonnes to Pantikapaion, who in turn sold this grain to Athens in mainland Greece. The dealings between mainland Greece and the northern Pontic region were significant enough that the Athenian Dēmosthenēs had significant commercial endeavours in the Bosporan kingdom, from where he received a 1000 medimnoi of wheat per year, and he had the statues of the Bosporan rulers Pairisadēs I, Satyros I and Gorgippos insalled in the Athenian market.

Dēmosthenēs himself had had a Scythian maternal grandmother, and his political opponents Dinarchus and Aeschines went so far as to launch racist attacks against Dēmosthenēs by referring to his Scythian ancestry to attempt discrediting him.

==== Early Sarmatian immigration ====
The Scythian kingdom experienced an early wave of immigration by a related Iranic nomadic people, the Sarmatians, during the 4th century BCE, to the Pontic steppe. This slow flow of Sarmatian immigration continued during the late 4th and early 3rd centuries BCE, but these small and isolated groups did not negatively affect its hegemony.

=== The reign of Ateas ===
Coin of the Scythian king Ateas

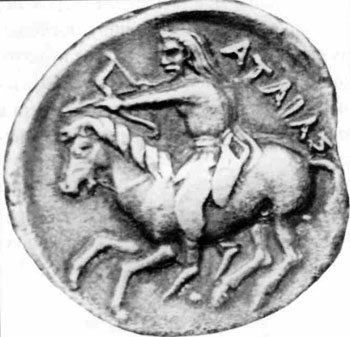
Reverse: depicting a mounted warrior and a coin legend reading ΑΤΑΙΑΣ

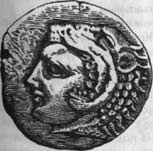
Obverse: depicting the head of Herakles

Between c. 360s and 339 BCE, the Scythians were ruled by their most famous king, Ateas, whose reign coincided with the growth of the kingdom of Macedonia under its king Philip II into a powerful kingdom capable of annexing much of Thrace until the Istros river. Estimates for the extent of the power of Ateas range from him having united all of Scythia from the Istros to the Tanais under his power to him being a leader of a group of Scythians who had retreated westwards under Sauromatian pressure and ruling only the western part of the Scythian kingdom.

By this period, Scythian tribes had already settled permanently on the lands to the south of the Istros corresponding to the region now called the Dobruja, and possibly in what is presently the Ludogorie region as well, where the people of Ateas lived with their families and their livestock. Consequently, the Tauric Chersonese and the region between the lower Istros and the Black Sea in northeastern Thrace both started being called "Little Scythia" (Ancient Greek: Μικρά Σκυθία, romanized: Mikrá Skuthía; Latin: Scythia Minor).

The main activities of Ateas were directed towards the Scythian border with Thrace on the Istros, so that by around c. 350 BCE he had captured lands from the Getae and expanded Scythian hegemony to the lands south of the Istros and to the Greek cities of the coast of the Black Sea and the parts of Thrace immediately south of the Istros, where he captured Kallatis and issued coins there. Ateas also successfully battled the Thracian Triballi and the Dacian Histriani, as well as threatened to conquer the city of Byzantion, where he may also have struck his coins.

Since both Ateas and Philip had been interested in the region to the immediate south of the Istros, the two kings formed an alliance against the Histriani. However, this alliance soon fell apart after Ateas refused to support Philip II's advance on Byzantion, and war broke out between the Scythian and Macedonian kingdoms, ending in 339 BCE in a battle at the estuary of the Istros where died the then 90 year old Ateas while Philip II was wounded, after which the Macedonians captured 20,000 Scythian women and children, a large number of cattle and more than 20,000 thoroughbred horses.

The Scythian kingdom had lost its new territories in Thrace and to the north of the Istros due to this defeat, which allowed the Getae to cross the Istros and settle between the Pyretos and the Tyras rivers. The power of Scythian kingdom was however not harmed by the death of Ateas, and it did not experience any weakening or disintegration as a result of it: the Kamianka city continued to prosper and the Scythian burials from this time were still as lavishly furnished as those of the most prosperous periods of the 4th century BCE, and a Scythian population continued to live in northeast Thrace.

=== The late 4th century BCE ===
The defeat against Philip II would however be followed by a series of military defeats of the Scythian kingdom which would lead to it experiencing a very significant decline during the late 4th century BCE.

Although the experience of Philip II's military dealings with the Scythians led his son Alexander III to choose to avoid attacking the then still powerful Scythians, in 335 BCE Alexander III crossed the Istros into Scythian territory during his campaign against the Getae, which harmed the remaining trade networks that Pontic Olbia could still depend on.

Between 339 and 329 BCE, a Scythian king whose name has not been recorded fought a war against the king Pairisadēs I of the Bosporan kingdom.

In 331 or 330 BCE, Alexander III's general Zopyrion, who was then acting as the governor of Thrace, campaigned against the Getae and the Scythian kingdom. Although Zōpyriōn's army of 30,000 men was able to reach Pontic Olbia and besiege it, they failed to capture it, and were defeated by the Scythians, with Zopyrion himself getting killed. Despite Zopyrion's defeat, his attack initiated the final decline of Olbia, and various tribes from the West such as the Celts started moving into its territories.

Nevertheless, in 329 BCE, the Scythian kingdom sent an embassy to Alexander at the time of his campaign in Bactria and Sogdia, after which Alexander sent an ambassador of his own to go to Pontic Scythia with the returning Scythian embassy. Alexander's ambassador came back with another Scythian embassy after he had spent the winter in Bactria. During this time, the king of Scythia died and was succeeded by his brother, Agaros, in c. 328 BCE.

In 313 BCE, the Agaros attempted to invade the territory to the south of the Istros again, but was defeated by the Macedonian king of Thrace, the diadoch Lysimachus.

In 309 BCE, Agaros participated in the Bosporan Civil War on the side of Satyros II, son of Pairisadēs I, against his half-brother Eumēlos. Agaros provided Satyros with 20,000 infantrymen and 10,000 cavalrymen, and after Satyros was defeated and killed, his son, also named Paerisades, fled to Agaros's realm for refuge.

In the early 3rd century BCE, the Scythian kingdom started declining economically as a result of competition from Egypt, which under the Ptolemaic dynasty had again become a supplier of grain to Greece.

=== End of Pontic Scythia ===
In the early 3rd century BCE, the Scythian kingdom faced a number of interlocking unfavourable conditions, such as climatic changes in the steppes and economic crises from overgrazed pastures and a series of military setbacks, as well as the intensifiation of the arrival from the east of the Sarmatians, who launched ravaging attacks against the Scythians, defeated them, and captured their pastures, with the smaller and more active Sarmatian groups overwhelming and subjugating the more numerous but politically static Scythians With the deprivation of its pastures, which were its most important resource, the Scythian kingdom suddenly collapsed, Scythian rule over the Pontic Steppe ended, and the Scythian capital of Kamianka was abandoned.

The Sarmatian tribe responsible for most of the destruction of the Pontic Scythian kingdom were the Roxolani, who had in the 4th century BCE lived the trans-Araxes region, and from there crossed the Tanais river and captured the Pontic Steppe up to the Borysthenēs, where they may have become a mixed Scytho-Sarmatian tribe at this time.

As a consequence of the sudden end of the Pontic Scythian kingdom, the material culture of the Scythians also disappeared in the early 3rd century BCE, with the large Scythian kurgans stopping being built and the large cities, such as the one at Gelonus, being abandoned at that time, and there being no known Scythian or Sarmatian monuments from this period. With the end of the Scythian kingdom, the peoples of the forest steppe became independent again returned to their original mixed farmer sedentary lifestyle while all Scythian elements disappeared from their culture.

With the end of the Pontic Scythian kingdom, grain exports from the northern Pontic region declined drastically, while Greek inscriptions stopped mentioning names of Scythian slaves, which were instead replaced by slaves of Sarmatian, Maeotian and other northern Pontic origins.

Following the invasion, the Sarmatian tribes became the new dominant force of the Pontic Steppe, resulting in the name "Sarmatia Europa" (lit. 'European Sarmatia') replacing "Scythia" as the name of the Pontic Steppe, and the name "Sarmatians" replacing that of "Scythians" as the generic designation of the peoples of the Pontic-Caspian Steppes until the invasion of the Huns.

Sarmatian pressure against the Scythians continued in the 3rd century BCE, so that the Sarmatians had reached as far as the city of Chersonesus in the Tauric Chersonese by 280 BCE, and most native and Greek settlements on the north shore of the Black Sea were destroyed by the Sarmatians over the course of the c. 270s to c. 260s BCE, causing the Greek cities of the north shore of the Black Sea to decline, sometimes even into desolate ruins.

Around this time, the Scythians of the Tauric Chersonese had already become vassals of a Sarmatian tribe whose queen Amage allied with the city of Chersonesus. At one point, Amage intervened against these Scythian vassals of hers and executed their king for being rebellious. The historicity of Amage is however unclear.

In the regions to the west of the Borysthenēs, some Celtic groups crossed the Carpathians and settled down in the valleys of the Tyras and Pyretus rivers. These Celts, along with the Thracian Getae and the Germanic Bastarnae from the west, were also putting the Scythians under pressure by seizing their lands to expand their own territories.

By around some time between c. 220 and c. 210 BCE, the Protogenes inscriptions recorded the Scythians as one of the minor groups who, along with the Sarmatian tribes of the Thisamatae and Saudaratae, were seeking shelter from the allied forces of the Celtic Galatae and the Germanic Sciri in the region of the Borysthenēs river near Pontic Olbia.

By the early 2nd century BCE, the Bastarnae had grown powerful enough that they were able to stop the southward advance of the Sarmatians along the line of the Istros river.

== Late period ==
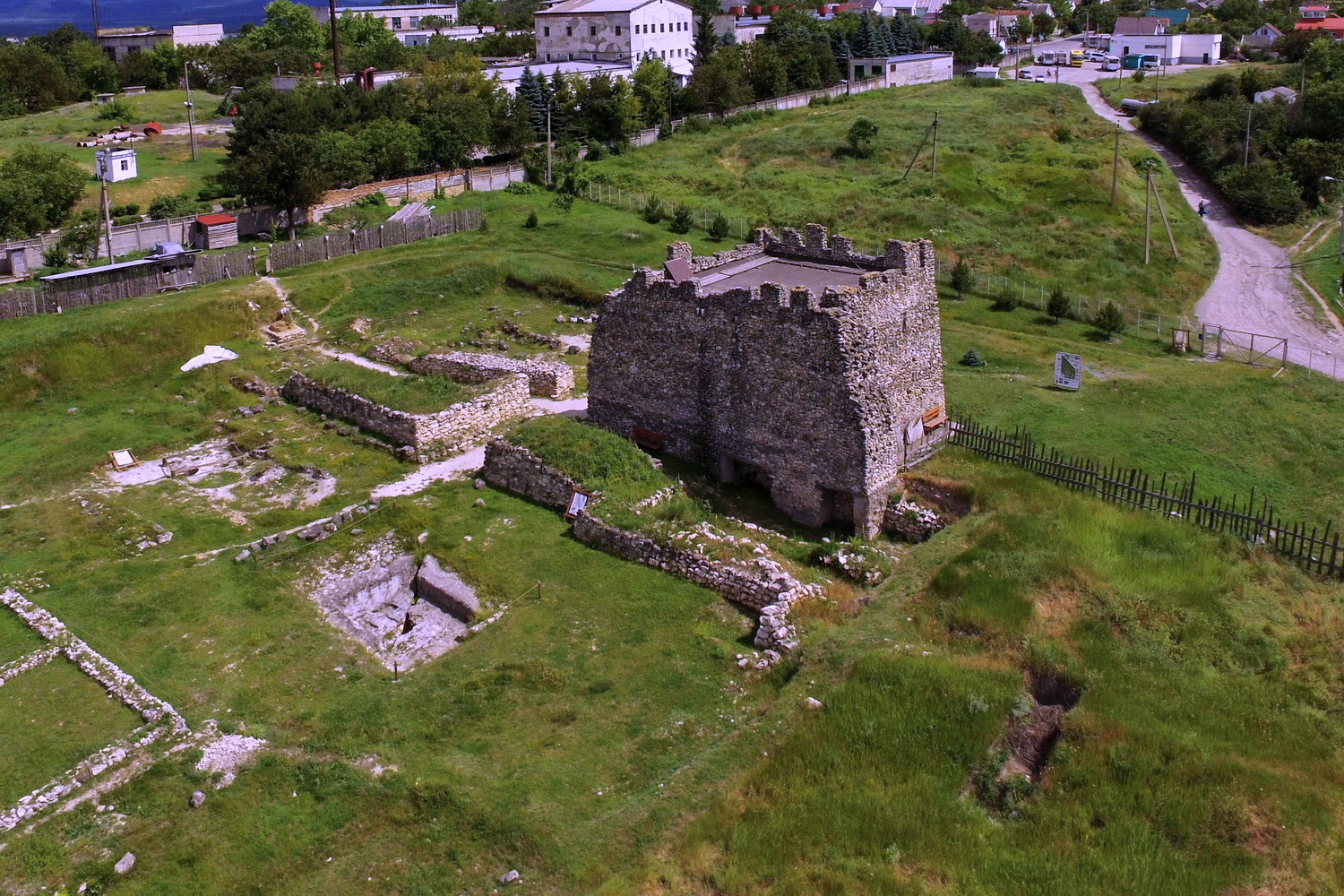
Remains of Scythian Neapolis near modern-day Simferopol, Crimea. It served as the capital of the Little Scythia in the Tauric Chersonese.

With the Sarmatian invasion and the collapse of the Pontic Scythian kingdom, the Scythians were pushed to the fringes of the northern Pontic region where urban life was still possible, and they retreated to a series of fortified settlements along the major rivers and fled to the two regions both known as "Little Scythia," which remained the only places where the Scythians could still be found in by the 2nd century BCE were:

- the first Little Scythia, whose capital was Scythian Neapolis, was composed of the territories of the Tauric Chersonese and the lower reaches of the Borysthenēs and Hypanis rivers;
- the second Little Scythia was located in the northeast of Thrace immediately to the south of the mouth of the Istros river and the west of the Black Sea, in the territory corresponding to present-day Dobruja.

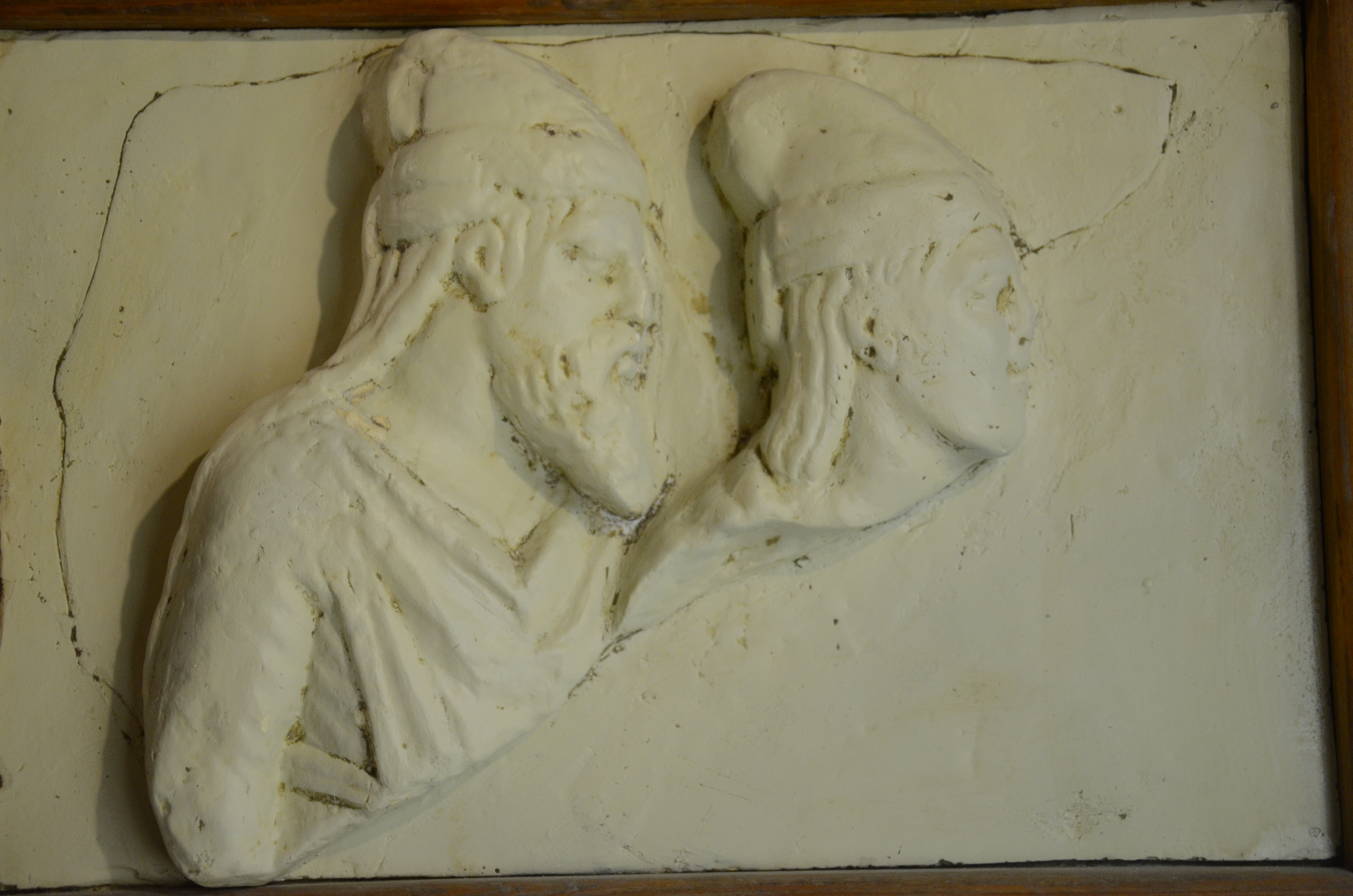
Relief of the most well-known kings of the Tauric Little Scythia, Skilurus and his son Palacus.

By this time, although the Scythians living in the Tauric Chersonese had managed to retain some of their nomadic lifestyle, the limited area of their polity forced them to become more and more sedentary and to primarily engage in stockbreeding in far away pastures, as well as in agriculture, and they also acted as trading intermediaries between the Graeco-Roman world and the peoples of the steppes.

With sedentarisation, both fortified and unfortified settlements replaced the older nomadic camps in the basin of the lower Borysthenēs river, which prevented the remaining Scythians from continuing to maintain a steppe economy. Therefore, the number of fortified settlements in the Tauric Chersonese increased with the retreat into this territory and away from the steppe of the Scythian aristocracy, who was then rapidly embracing a Hellenistic lifestyle. By the 1st century BCE, these Scythians living in the Tauric Chersonese had fully become sedentary farmers.

These later Scythians slowly intermarried with the native Tauri and the infiltrating Sarmatians, and their culture had little to do with the earlier classical Scythian culture, instead consisting of a combination of those with the traditions of the Tauroi from the mountains of the Tauric Chersonese and of the Greeks of the coasts, and exhibiting Sarmatian and La Tène Celtic influences.

In the 1st century BCE, both Little Scythias were destroyed and their territories annexed by the king Mithridates VI Eupator of the kingdom of Pontus despite the Scythians' alliance with their former enemies, the Roxolani, against him.

== End ==
The Scythian populations in both Little Scythias continued to exist after the end of Mithridates's empire, although they had become fully sedentary by then and were increasingly intermarrying with the native Tauri, hence why Roman sources often referred to them as "Tauro-Scythians" (Ancient Greek: Ταυροσκύθαι, romanized: Tauroskúthai; Latin: Tauroscythae).

These late Scythians were slowly assimilated by the Sarmatians over the course of c. 50 to c. 150 CE, although they continued to exist as an independent people throughout the 2nd century CE until around c. 250 CE: in the settled regions of the lower Borysthenēs, lower Hypanis, and the Tauric Chersonese, an urbanised and Hellenised Scythian society continued to develop which also exhibited Thracian and Celtic influences.

The Scytho-Sarmatian Iranic nomads' dominance of the Pontic Steppe finally ended with the invasion of the Goths and other Germanic tribes around c. 200 CE, which was when the Scythian settlements in Crimea and the lower Borysthenēs were permanently destroyed.

The Scythians nevertheless continued to exist until the invasion of the Huns in the 4th century CE, and they finally ceased to exist as an independent group after being fully assimilated by the other populations who moved into the Pontic Steppe at the height of the Migration Period in the 5th century CE.

== Sources ==
- Adalı, Selim Ferruh (2017). "Cimmerians and the Scythians: the Impact of Nomadic Powers on the Assyrian Empire and the Ancient Near East". In Kim, Hyun Jin; Vervaet, Frederik Juliaan; Adalı, Selim Ferruh (eds.). Eurasian Empires in Antiquity and the Early Middle Ages Contact and Exchange between the Graeco- Roman World, Inner Asia and China. Cambridge: Cambridge University Press. pp. 60–82. ISBN 978-1-107-19041-2.
- Adalı, Selim Ferruh (2023). "The Phantom Menace? The Chronology of Cimmerian Expeditions, Territories and Zones of Influence in Anatolia". In Draycott, Catherine M.; Branting, Scott; Lehner, Joseph W.; Özarslan, Yasemin (eds.). From Midas to Cyrus and Other Stories: Papers on Iron Age Anatolia in Honour of Geoffrey and Françoise Summers. BIAA Monograph Series. London, United Kingdom: British Institute at Ankara. pp. 209–228. ISBN 978-1-912-09011-2.
- Alekseyev, Andrey Yu. [in Russian] (2005). "Scythian Kings and 'Royal' Burial-Mounds of the Fifth and Fourth Centuries BC". In Braund, David (ed.). Scythians and Greeks: Cultural Interaction in Scythia, Athens and the Early Roman Empire (sixth Century BC - First Century AD). Exeter, United Kingdom: University of Exeter Press. pp. 39–56. ISBN 978-0-859-89746-4. Archived from the original on 24 September 2024.
- Armbruster, Barbara (2009). "Gold technology of the ancient Scythians – gold from the kurgan Arzhan 2, Tuva". ArchéoSciences - Revue d'Archéométrie [ArchaeoSciences - Journal of Archaeometry] (in French). 33 (33): 187–193. doi:10.4000/archeosciences.2193. ISSN 1960-1360.
- Barnett, R. D. (1982). "Urartu". In Boardman, John; Edwards, I. E. S.; Hammond, N. G. L.; Sollberger, E. (eds.). The Prehistory of the Balkans; and the Middle East and the Aegean world, tenth to eighth centuries B.C. The Cambridge Ancient History. Vol. 3. Cambridge, United Kingdom: Cambridge University Press. pp. 314–371. ISBN 978-1-139-05428-7.
- Barnett, R. D. (1991). "Urartu". In Boardman, John; Edwards, I. E. S.; Hammond, N. G. L.; Sollberger, E. (eds.). The Prehistory of the Balkans; and the Middle East and the Aegean world, tenth to eighth centuries B.C. The Cambridge Ancient History. Vol. 3. Cambridge, United Kingdom: Cambridge University Press. pp. 314–371. ISBN 978-1-139-05428-7.
- Batty, Roger (2007). Rome and the Nomads: The Pontic-Danubian Realm in Antiquity. Oxford: Oxford University Press. ISBN 978-0-198-14936-1.
- Baumer, Christoph (26 August 2021). At the Crossroads of Empires. History of the Caucasus. Vol. 1. Bloomsbury Publishing. ISBN 978-0-7556-3969-4.
- Braun, T. F. R. G. (1982). "The Greeks in Egypt". In Boardman, John; Hammond, N. G. L. (eds.). The Expansion of the Greek World, Eighth to Sixth Centuries B.C. The Cambridge Ancient History. Vol. 3. Cambridge, United Kingdom: Cambridge University Press. pp. 32–56. ISBN 978-0-521-23447-4.
- Brinkman, J. A. (1991). "Babylonia in the Shadow of Assyria". In Boardman, John; Edwards, I. E. S.; Hammond, N. G. L.; Sollberger, E.; Walker, C. B. F. (eds.). The Assyrian and Babylonian Empires and other States of the Near East, from the Eighth to the Sixth Centuries B.C. The Cambridge Ancient History. Vol. 3. Cambridge, United Kingdom: Cambridge University Press. pp. 1–70. ISBN 978-1-139-05429-4.
- Bukharin, Mikhail Dmitrievich [in Russian] (2013). "Колаксай и его братья (античная традиция о происхождении царской власти у скифов" [Kolaxais and his Brothers (Classical Tradition on the Origin of the Royal Power of the Scythians)]. Аристей: вестник классической филологии и античной истории [Aristaeus: Journal of Classical Philology and Ancient History] (in Russian). 3: 20–80.
- Cook, J. M. (1982). "The Eastern Greeks". In Boardman, John; Hammond, N. G. L. (eds.). The Expansion of the Greek World, Eighth to Sixth Centuries B.C. The Cambridge Ancient History. Vol. 3. Cambridge, United Kingdom: Cambridge University Press. pp. 196–221. ISBN 978-0-521-23447-4.
- Cunliffe, Barry (2019). The Scythians: Nomad Warriors of the Steppe. Oxford: Oxford University Press. ISBN 978-0-198-82012-3.
- Dandamaev, Muhammad (1991). "28a. Neo-Babylonian society and economy". In Boardman, John; Edwards, I. E. S.; Hammond, N. G. L.; Sollberger, E.; Walker, C. B. F. (eds.). The Assyrian and Babylonian Empires and other States of the Near East, from the Eighth to the Sixth Centuries B.C. The Cambridge Ancient History. Vol. 3. Cambridge, United Kingdom: Cambridge University Press. pp. 252–275. ISBN 978-1-139-05429-4.
- Dandamayev, Muhammad (1994). "Media and Achaemenid Iran". In Harmatta, János Harmatta (ed.). History of Civilizations of Central Asia: The Development of Sedentary and Nomadic Civilizations, 700 B. C. to A. D. 250. Vol. 1. UNESCO. pp. 35–64. ISBN 9231028464.
- Dandamayev, M.; Medvedskaya, Inna [in Russian] (2006). "Media". Encyclopædia Iranica. New York City, United States: Encyclopædia Iranica Foundation; Brill Publishers. Archived from the original on 26 October 2023.
- Diakonoff, I. M. (1985). "Media". In Gershevitch, Ilya (ed.). The Median and Achaemenian Periods. The Cambridge History of Iran. Vol. 2. Cambridge, United Kingdom: Cambridge University Press. ISBN 978-0-521-20091-2.
- Bouzek, Jan [in Hungarian] (2001). "Cimmerians and Early Scythians: the Transition from Geometric to Orientalising Style in the Pontic Area". In Tsetskhladze, G.R. (ed.). North Pontic Archaeology: Recent Discoveries and Studies. Leiden, Netherlands: Brill Publishers. pp. 33–44. ISBN 978-9-004-12041-9.
- Dale, Alexander (2015). "WALWET and KUKALIM: Lydian coin legends, dynastic succession, and the chronology of Mermnad kings". Kadmos. 54: 151–166. doi:10.1515/kadmos-2015-0008. S2CID 165043567. Archived from the original on 6 February 2022.
- de Boer, Jan (2006). "The Cimmerian invasions in Anatolia and the earliest Greek colonies in the Black Sea area". Eirene. Studia Graeca et Latina. 42: 43–55. Archived from the original on 21 August 2024.
- de Boer, Jan (2021). "The 'Western Cimmerians' and the first Greek settlers in the Troad". In Tsetskhladze, Gocha R.; Avram, Alexandru; Hargrave, James (eds.). The Greeks and Romans in the Black Sea and the Importance of the Pontic Region for the Graeco-Roman World (7th century BC - 5th century AD): 20 Years On (1997-2017): Proceedings of the Sixth International Congress on Black Sea Antiquities (Constanța - 18-22 September 2017). Oxford, United Kingdom: Archaeopress Publishing Limited. pp. 20–26. ISBN 978-1-789-69759-9. Archived from the original on 24 September 2024.
- Diakonoff, I. M. (1993). "Cyaxares". Encyclopædia Iranica. New York City, United States: Encyclopædia Iranica Foundation; Brill Publishers. Archived from the original on 29 April 2011.
- Dugaw, Sean; Lipschits, Oded; Stiebel, Guy D. (2020). "A New Typology of Arrowheads from the Late Iron Age and Persian Period and Its Historical Implications". Israel Exploration Journal. 70 (1): 64–89. JSTOR 27100276. Archived from the original on 6 June 2023.
- Fol, Alexander; Hammond, N. G. L. (1988). "Persia in Europe, Apart from Greece". In Boardman, John; Hammond, N. G. L.; Lewis, D. M.; Ostwald, M. (eds.). Persia, Greece and the Western Mediterranean, c. 525 to 479 B.C. The Cambridge Ancient History. Vol. 4. Cambridge: Cambridge University Press. pp. 234–253. ISBN 978-0-521-22804-6.
- Fuchs, Andreas [in German] (2023). "The Medes and the Kingdom of Mannea". In Radner, Karen; Moeller, Nadine; Potts, Daniel T. (eds.). The Age of Assyria. The Oxford History of the Ancient Near East. Vol. 4. New York City, United States: Oxford University Press. pp. 674–768. ISBN 978-0-190-68763-2.
- Geel, Bas; Bokovenko, Nikolay; Burova, N.; Chugunov, K.; Dergachev, Valentin; Dirksen, Veronika; Kulkova, M.; Nagler, A.; Parzinger, H. (2005-01-01), The Sun, Climate Change and the Expansion of the Scythian Culture After 850 BC, pp. 151–158, doi:10.1007/1-4020-2656-0_13, ISBN 978-1-4020-2655-3
- Graham, A. J. (1982). "The colonial expansion of Greece". In Boardman, John; Hammond, N. G. L. (eds.). The Expansion of the Greek World, Eighth to Sixth Centuries B.C. The Cambridge Ancient History. Vol. 3. Cambridge, United Kingdom: Cambridge University Press. pp. 83–162. ISBN 978-0-521-23447-4.
- Grayson, A. K. [in German] (1991a). "Assyria: Sennacherib and Esarhaddon". In Boardman, John; Edwards, I. E. S.; Hammond, N. G. L.; Sollberger, E.; Walker, C. B. F. (eds.). The Assyrian and Babylonian Empires and other States of the Near East, from the Eighth to the Sixth Centuries B.C. The Cambridge Ancient History. Vol. 3. Cambridge, United Kingdom: Cambridge University Press. pp. 103–141. ISBN 978-1-139-05429-4.
- Grayson, A. K. [in German] (1991c). "Assyria 668-635 B.C.: the reign of Ashurbanipal". In Boardman, John; Edwards, I. E. S.; Hammond, N. G. L.; Sollberger, E.; Walker, C. B. F. (eds.). The Assyrian and Babylonian Empires and other States of the Near East, from the Eighth to the Sixth Centuries B.C. The Cambridge Ancient History. Vol. 3. Cambridge, United Kingdom: Cambridge University Press. pp. 142–161. ISBN 978-1-139-05429-4.
- Grousset, René (1970). The Empire of the Steppes: A History of Central Asia. Translated by Walford, Naomi. New Brunswick, United States: Rutgers University Press. ISBN 978-0-813-51304-1.
- Harmatta, János (1996). "10.4.1. The Scythians". In Hermann, Joachim; Zürcher, Erik; Harmatta, János; Litvak, J. K.; Lonis, R. [in French]; Obenga, T.; Thapar, R.; Zhou, Yiliang [in Chinese] (eds.). From the Seventh Century B.C. to the Seventh Century A.D. History of Humanity. Vol. 3. London, United Kingdom; New York City, United States; Paris, France: Routledge; UNESCO. pp. 181–182. ISBN 978-9-231-02812-0.
- Hartley, Charles W.; Yazicioğlu, G. Bike; Smith, Adam T. (2012). The Archaeology of Power and Politics in Eurasia: Regimes and Revolutions. Cambridge University Press. ISBN 978-1-107-01652-1.
- Hawkins, J. D. [in German] (1991). "The Neo-Hittite States in Syria and Anatolia". In Boardman, John; Edwards, I. E. S.; Hammond, N. G. L.; Sollberger, E. (eds.). The Prehistory of the Balkans; and the Middle East and the Aegean world, tenth to eighth centuries B.C. The Cambridge Ancient History. Vol. 3. Cambridge, United Kingdom: Cambridge University Press. pp. 372–441. ISBN 978-1-139-05428-7.
- Hawkins, J. D. [in German] (1982). "The Neo-Hittite States in Syria and Anatolia". In Boardman, John; Edwards, I. E. S.; Hammond, N. G. L.; Sollberger, E. (eds.). The Prehistory of the Balkans; and the Middle East and the Aegean world, tenth to eighth centuries B.C. The Cambridge Ancient History. Vol. 3. Cambridge, United Kingdom: Cambridge University Press. pp. 372–441. ISBN 978-1-139-05428-7.
- Herodotus; Godolphin, Francis R. B. (1973). "Herodotus: On the Scythians". The Metropolitan Museum of Art Bulletin. 32 (5): 129–149. doi:10.2307/3269235. JSTOR 3269235. Archived from the original on 26 November 2021.
- Ivantchik, Askold (1993a). Les Cimmériens au Proche-Orient [The Cimmerians in the Near East] (PDF) (in French). Fribourg, Switzerland; Göttingen, Germany: Éditions Universitaires Fribourg (Switzerland); Vandenhoeck & Ruprecht (Germany). ISBN 978-3-727-80876-0. Archived (PDF) from the original on 13 August 2022.
- Ivantchik, Askold (1993b). "LES GUERRIERS-CHIENS: Loups-garous et invasions scythes en Asie Mineure" [The Dog Warriors: Werewolves and Scythian invasions in Asia Minor]. Revue de l'histoire des religions [Review of the History of Religions]. 210 (3): 305–330. doi:10.3406/rhr.1993.1478. JSTOR 23671794. Archived from the original on 14 August 2023.
- Ivantchik, Askold (1999a). "The Scythian 'Rule Over Asia': the Classical Tradition and the Historical Reality". In Tsetskhladze, G.R. (ed.). Ancient Greeks West and East. Leiden, Netherlands: Brill. pp. 497–520. ISBN 978-9-004-11190-5. Archived from the original on 14 August 2023.
- Ivantchik, Askold (1999c). "The Scythian 'Rule Over Asia': the Classical Tradition and the Historical Reality". In Tsetskhladze, G.R. (ed.). Ancient Greeks West and East. Leiden, Netherlands: Brill. pp. 497–520. ISBN 978-9-004-11190-5. Archived from the original on 14 August 2023.
- Ivantchik, Askold (2001). "The Current State of the Cimmerian Problem". Ancient Civilizations from Scythia to Siberia. 7 (3): 307–339. doi:10.1163/15700570152758043.
- Ivantchik, Askold (2006). "Reconstructing Cimmerian and Early Scythian History: The Written Sources". In Aruz, Joan [in French]; Farkas, Ann; Fino, Elisabetta Valtz (eds.). The Golden Deer of Eurasia: Perspectives on the Steppe Nomads of the Ancient World. New Haven, United States; New York City, United States; London, United Kingdom: The Metropolitan Museum of Art; Yale University Press. pp. 146–153. ISBN 978-1-588-39205-3.
- Ivantchik, Askold (2018). "Scythians". Encyclopædia Iranica. New York City, United States: Encyclopædia Iranica Foundation; Brill Publishers. Archived from the original on 17 August 2022.
- Jacobson, Esther (1995). The Art of the Scythians: The Interpenetration of Cultures at the Edge of the Hellenic World. Handbuch der Orientalistik. Leiden, Netherlands: Brill Publishers. ISBN 978-9-004-09856-5.
- Jettmar, Karl [in German] (1971). "Metallurgy in the Early Steppes" (PDF). Artibus Asiae. 33 (1): 5–16. doi:10.2307/3249786. JSTOR 3249786. Archived (PDF) from the original on 17 May 2023.
- Kõiv, Mait [in Estonian] (2022). "Lydia, Phrygia and the Cimmerians: Mesopotamian and Greek evidence combined". In Mattila, Raija [in Finnish]; Fink, Sebastian; Ito, Sanae (eds.). Evidence Combined: Western and Eastern Sources in Dialogue. Melammu Symposia. Vol. 11. Vienna, Austria: Austrian Academy of Sciences Press. pp. 261–294. ISBN 978-3-700-18573-4. Archived from the original on 21 August 2024.
- Kramberger, Anja Hellmuth (2014). "Horse, Bow and Arrow - A Comparison between the Scythian Impact on the Mediterranean and on the Eastern Middle Europe". Mediterranean Review. 7 (1): 1–38. Archived from the original on 6 June 2023.
- Lipiński, Edward (2006). On the Skirts of Canaan in the Iron Age: Historical and Topographical Researches. Leuven, Belgium; Paris, France; Dudley, United States: Peeters Publishers. ISBN 978-9-042-91798-9.
- Loehr, Max (1955). "The Stag Image in Scythia and the Far East". Archives of the Chinese Art Society of America. 9. Chinese Art Society of America: 63–76. JSTOR 20066973. Archived from the original on 14 August 2023.
- Mallory, J. P.; Adams, Douglas Q. (1997). Encyclopedia of Indo-European Culture. Taylor & Francis. ISBN 1-884964-98-2.
- Manoledakis, Manolis (20 May 2021). Peoples in the Black Sea Region from the Archaic to the Roman Period: Proceedings of the 3rd International Workshop on the Black Sea in Antiquity held in Thessaloniki, 21-23 September 2018. Archaeopress Publishing Ltd. ISBN 978-1-78969-868-8.
- Mellink, M. (1991). "The Native Kingdoms of Anatolia". In Boardman, John; Edwards, I. E. S.; Hammond, N. G. L.; Sollberger, E.; Walker, C. B. F. (eds.). The Assyrian and Babylonian Empires and other States of the Near East, from the Eighth to the Sixth Centuries B.C. The Cambridge Ancient History. Vol. 3. Cambridge, United Kingdom: Cambridge University Press. pp. 619–665. ISBN 978-1-139-05429-4.
- Melyukova, A. I. (1990). "The Scythians and Sarmatians". In Sinor, Denis (ed.). The Cambridge History of Early Inner Asia. Cambridge, United Kingdom: Cambridge University Press. pp. 97–117. ISBN 978-0-521-24304-9.
- Melyukova, Anna I. (1995). "2. Scythians of Southeastern Europe". In Davis-Kimball, Jeannine; Bashilov, Vladimir A.; Yablonsky, Leonid T. [in Russian] (eds.). Nomads of the Eurasian Steppes in the Early Iron Age. Berkeley, United States: Zinat Press. pp. 27–61. ISBN 978-1-885979-00-1.
- Oates, J. (1991). "The Fall of Assyria (635-609 B.C.)". In Boardman, John; Edwards, I. E. S.; Hammond, N. G. L.; Sollberger, E.; Walker, C. B. F. (eds.). The Assyrian and Babylonian Empires and other States of the Near East, from the Eighth to the Sixth Centuries B.C. The Cambridge Ancient History. Vol. 3. Cambridge, United Kingdom: Cambridge University Press. pp. 162–193. ISBN 978-1-139-05429-4.
- Olbrycht, Marek Jan [in Polish] (2000a). "The Cimmerian Problem Re-Examined: the Evidence of the Classical Sources". In Pstrusińska, Jadwiga [in Polish]; Fear, Andrew (eds.). Collectanea Celto-Asiatica Cracoviensia. Kraków: Księgarnia Akademicka. pp. 71–100. ISBN 978-8-371-88337-8. Archived from the original on 13 August 2022.
- Olbrycht, Marek Jan [in Polish] (2000b). "Remarks on the Presence of Iranian Peoples in Europe and Their Asiatic Relations". In Pstrusińska, Jadwiga [in Polish]; Fear, Andrew (eds.). Collectanea Celto-Asiatica Cracoviensia. Kraków: Księgarnia Akademicka. pp. 101–140. ISBN 978-8-371-88337-8. Archived from the original on 25 September 2022.
- Olkhovsky, Valery S. [in Russian] (1995). "3. Scythian Culture in the Crimea". In Davis-Kimball, Jeannine; Bashilov, Vladimir A.; Yablonsky, Leonid T. [in Russian] (eds.). Nomads of the Eurasian Steppes in the Early Iron Age. Berkeley, United States: Zinat Press. pp. 63–81. ISBN 978-1-885979-00-1.
- Parzinger, Hermann (2004). Die Skythen [The Scythians] (in German). Munich, Germany: Verlag C.H.Beck. ISBN 978-3-406-50842-4.
- Petrenko, Vladimir G. (1995). "1. Scythian Culture in the North Caucasus". In Davis-Kimball, Jeannine; Bashilov, Vladimir A.; Yablonsky, Leonid T. [in Russian] (eds.). Nomads of the Eurasian Steppes in the Early Iron Age. Berkeley, United States: Zinat Press. pp. 5–25. ISBN 978-1-885979-00-1.
- Phillips, E. D. (1972). "The Scythian Domination in Western Asia: Its Record in History, Scripture and Archaeology". World Archaeology. 4 (2): 129–138. doi:10.1080/00438243.1972.9979527. JSTOR 123971. Archived from the original on 5 November 2021.
- Sherwin-White, Susan M.; Kuhrt, Amélie (1993). From Samarkhand to Sardis: A New Approach to the Seleucid Empire. Berkeley, United States: University of California Press. ISBN 978-0-520-08183-3.
- Spalinger, Anthony J. [in German] (1978a). "The Date of the Death of Gyges and Its Historical Implications". Journal of the American Oriental Society. 98 (4): 400–409. doi:10.2307/599752. JSTOR 599752. Archived from the original on 29 August 2023.
- Spalinger, Anthony [in German] (1978b). "Psammetichus, King of Egypt: II". Journal of the American Research Center in Egypt. 15: 49–57. doi:10.2307/40000130. JSTOR 40000130. Archived from the original on 2 November 2021.
- Sulimirski, T. (1954). "Scythian Antiquities in Western Asia". Artibus Asiae. 17 (3). Ascona, Switzerland: Artibus Asiae Publishers: 282–318. doi:10.2307/3249059. JSTOR 3249059. Archived from the original on 7 April 2023.
- Sulimirski, T. (1985). "The Scyths". In Gershevitch, I. (ed.). The Median and Achaemenian Periods. The Cambridge History of Iran. Vol. 2. Cambridge, United Kingdom: Cambridge University Press. pp. 149–199. ISBN 978-1-139-05493-5.
- Sulimirski, Tadeusz; Taylor, T. F. (1991). "The Scythians". In Boardman, John; Edwards, I. E. S.; Hammond, N. G. L.; Sollberger, E.; Walker, C. B. F. (eds.). The Assyrian and Babylonian Empires and other States of the Near East, from the Eighth to the Sixth Centuries B.C. The Cambridge Ancient History. Vol. 3. Cambridge, United Kingdom: Cambridge University Press. pp. 547–590. ISBN 978-1-139-05429-4.
- Tokhtas'ev, Sergei R. [in Russian] (1991). "Cimmerians". Encyclopædia Iranica. New York City, United States: Encyclopædia Iranica Foundation; Brill Publishers. Archived from the original on 29 April 2011.
- Unterländer, Martina (2017). "Ancestry and demography and descendants of Iron Age nomads of the Eurasian Steppe". Nature Communications. 8 14615. Bibcode:2017NatCo...814615U. doi:10.1038/ncomms14615. PMC 5337992. PMID 28256537.
- Ustinova, Yulia (1999). The Supreme Gods of the Bosporan Kingdom: Celestial Aphrodite and the Most High God. Leiden, Netherlands; Boston, United States: BRILL. ISBN 978-9-004-11231-5.
- Vaggione, Richard P. (1973). "Over All Asia? The Extent of the Scythian Domination in Herodotus". Journal of Biblical Literature. 92 (4): 523–530. doi:10.2307/3263121. JSTOR 3263121. Archived from the original on 21 August 2022.
- West, Stephanie (2002). "Scythians". In Bakker, Egbert J.; de Jong, Irene J. F.; van Wees, Hans (eds.). Brill's Companion to Herodotus. Brill. pp. 437–456. ISBN 978-90-04-21758-4. Archived from the original on 5 September 2019.
- Xydopoulos, Ioannis K. (2015). "The Cimmerians: their origins, movements and their difficulties". In Tsetskhladze, Gocha R.; Avram, Alexandru; Hargrave, James (eds.). The Danubian Lands Between the Black, Aegean and Adriatic Seas (7th Century BC-10th Century AD): Proceedings of the Fifth International Congress on Black Sea Antiquities (Belgrade - 17-21 September 2013). Oxford, United Kingdom: Archaeopress Publishing Limited. pp. 119–123. ISBN 978-1-784-91192-8. Archived from the original on 24 September 2024.
- Yablonsky, Leonid T. [in Russian] (2006). "Reconstructing Cimmerian and Early Scythian History: The Written Sources". In Aruz, Joan [in French]; Farkas, Ann; Fino, Elisabetta Valtz (eds.). The Golden Deer of Eurasia: Perspectives on the Steppe Nomads of the Ancient World. New Haven, Connecticut, United States; New York City, United States; London, United Kingdom: The Metropolitan Museum of Art; Yale University Press. pp. 24–31. ISBN 978-1-588-39205-3.
- Young, T. Cuyler (1988a). "The early history of the Medes and the Persians and the Achaemenid empire to the death of Cambyses". In Boardman, John; Hammond, N. G. L.; Lewis, D. M.; Ostwald, M. (eds.). Persia, Greece and the Western Mediterranean, c. 525 to 479 B.C. The Cambridge Ancient History. Vol. 4. Cambridge, United Kingdom: Cambridge University Press. pp. 1–52. ISBN 978-0-521-22804-6.
- Young, T. Cuyler (1988b). "The Consolidation of the Empire and its Limits of Growth under Darius and Xerxes". In Boardman, John; Hammond, N. G. L.; Lewis, D. M.; Ostwald, M. (eds.). Persia, Greece and the Western Mediterranean, c. 525 to 479 B.C. The Cambridge Ancient History. Vol. 4. Cambridge, United Kingdom: Cambridge University Press. pp. 53–111. ISBN 978-0-521-22804-6.
- Zaikov, A. V. (2004). "Alcman and the Image of Scythian Steed". In Tuplin, Christopher (ed.). Pontus and the Outside World: Studies in Black Sea History, Historiography, and Archaeology. Colloquia Pontica. Leiden, Netherlands: Brill Publishers. pp. 69–84. ISBN 978-9-004-12154-6. Archived from the original on 19 June 2023.
