= Lydian–Milesian War =

War in the Archaic Age in Ionia

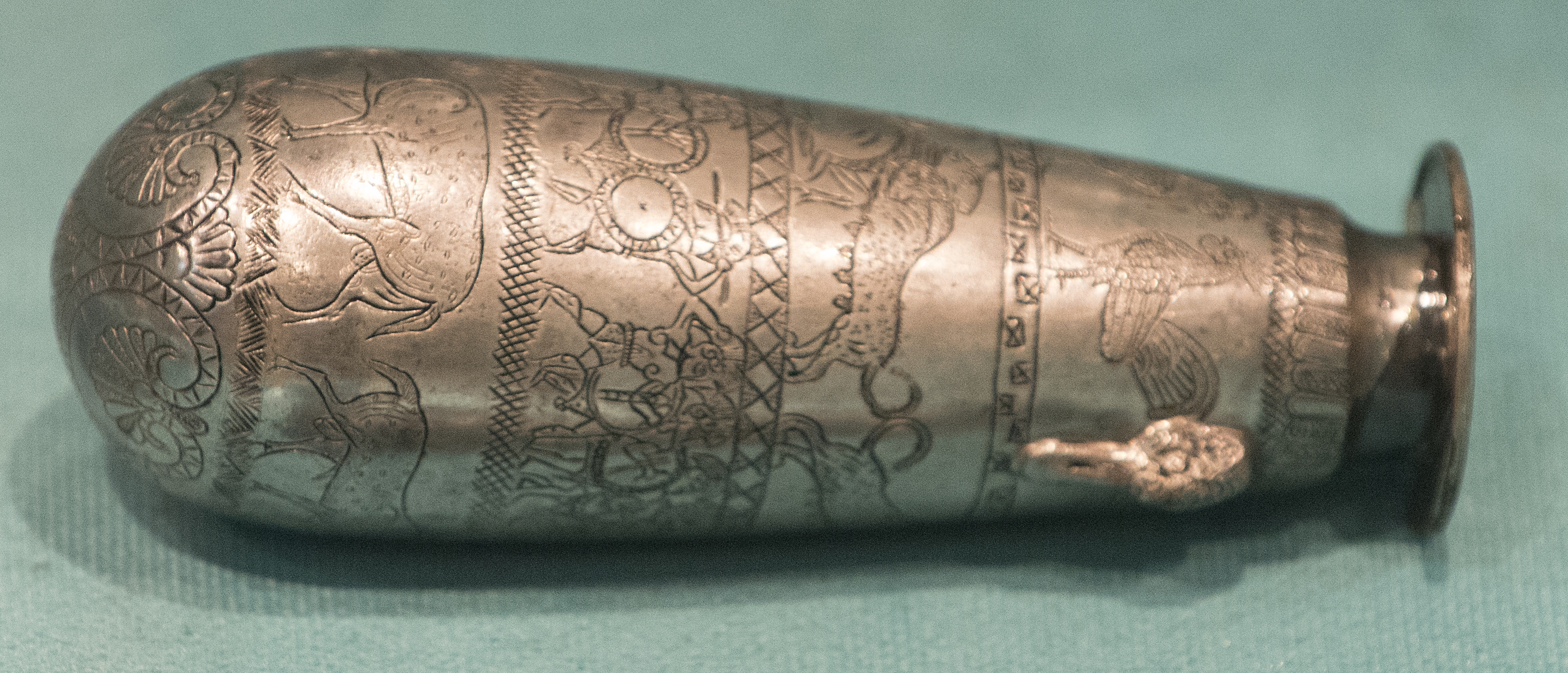
- A silver alabastron from the Karun Treasure, alternatively known as 'the Lydian Hoard'. The middle frame shows a skirmish between hoplites
Date	c. 612–600 BC (12 years)
Location	Miletus (present-day Balat, Didim, Turkey): Assesos
Result	Indecisive; Treaty between Lydia and Miletus

Belligerents
Lydia	Miletus: Chios

Commanders and leaders
Gyges of Lydia; Ardys of Lydia; Sadyattes of Lydia; Alyattes of Lydia	Thrasybulus of Miletus: Periander of Corinth

The Lydian–Milesian War was a military conflict between the Kingdom of Lydia and the ancient Greek city state of Miletus. It took place during the 7th century BC in the Archaic period, traditionally set between 612 and 600 BC. The main source of the war is Herodotus, who wrote about it in the opening chapters of his Histories. The war ended after 12 years when the tyrant of Miletus, Thrasybulus of Miletus, convinced the Lydian king Alyattes to sue for peace with a ruse, after which an alliance between the two states was forged. Amongst other things, the length of the war has caused debate among modern historians.

== The date of the war ==
According to Herodotus, the war broke out during the reign of king Sadyattes of the Mermnad dynasty (c. 637–635 BC) and went on for six years, until the king died and his son Alyattes took over, after which the war would last another six years for a total of 12 years. However, some scholars suggest Herodotus made up these facts about the timespan, similar to the way Homer made the Trojan War last 10 years. Such a ‘symmetrical’ and ‘awkward’ time span would be meant symbolically, says D. Fehling. This is not the only problem concerning duration however, as Sadyattes’ reign has been estimated too short for him to wage six years of war by modern historians, but Herodotus recounts a reign lasting twelve years. Similarly, it is unknown if Gyges and Ardys actually attacked Miletus or if this is just another way to indicate the 'barbaric' aggression towards Greece, one of the main topics or topoi of the Histories. Furthermore, there was most likely no continuous war or siege as Herodotus describes Alyattes 'invading when the crops were ripe', something that usually occurred in June.

Lastly, the exact dates of the war are unsure. While most place the end of the conflict in 600 BC, alternative dates (608 BC, 602 BC, 598 BC and 594 BC) have been mentioned. The entire chronology of Lydian history is uncertain, and researches have been dedicated to creating a definitive timeline even in ancient times: Eusebius of Caesaria, Jerome of Stridon, and Sextus Julius Africanus all wrote about the Mermnad dynasty. These claims have been supported by archeological finds in the former Milesian territory at Assesos (current Mengerevtepe, Turkey), but these layers cannot be dated precisely. As such, it remains impossible to say with certainty when the conflict between Lydia and Miletus took place.

== Prelude ==
In the early 8th century BC, Gyges usurped the Lydian king Candaules of the Heraclid dynasty, a line of descendants of Herakles. After Gyges killed the king and married his wife, he founded the Mermnad dynasty. This family would set out to conquer Asia Minor; Gyges took Colophon, his son and successor Ardys captured Priene, and Sadyattes, son of Ardys, would attempt to capture Miletus, following in the footsteps of his predecessors.

Miletus and its surroundings

Miletus had had their own age of expansion, frequently warring with neighboring states, Samos in particular. This competition drove Miletus to join the side of Eretria during the Lelantine War, as Samos was allied with Chalcis. Herodotus mentions Miletus had formed an alliance with Chios as well, and they would be the only Ionians to help the city during the war with Lydia. Perhaps this too was caused by the Lelantine War, as it is stated that "the Milesians had formerly helped the Chians in their war against the Erythraeans."

After the invasions of the first Mermnad kings, Miletus fortified itself, strengthening its four-metre-thick city walls. These walls were similar to those of Smyrna, renowned in the ancient world.

== Invasion ==
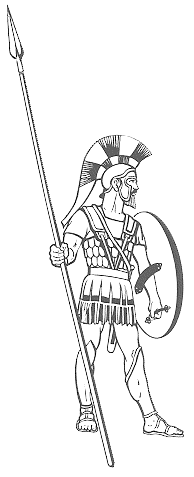
An ancient Greek hoplite with a long doru spear, a round aspis shield and a Corinthian helmet

Very little is known about the war during Sadyattes' reign, since Herodotus only writes about Alyattes. According to him, the fourth king of the Mermnadae waged war against Miletus as follows:

He [Alyattes] sent his invading army, marching to the sound of pipes and harps and flutes bass and treble, when the crops in the land were ripe: and whenever he came to the Milesian territory, the country dwellings he neither demolished nor burnt nor tore off their doors, but let them stand unharmed; but the trees and the crops of the land he destroyed, and so returned whence he came; for as the Milesians had command of the sea, it was of no avail for his army to besiege their city. The reason why the Lydian did not destroy the houses was this — that the Milesians might have homes whence to plant and cultivate their land, and that there might be the fruit of their toil for his invading army to lay waste.

As Herodotus says, it is unlikely that Alyattes actually besieged Miletus, but it remains unsure.

=== The Lydian and Milesian armies ===
Herodotus mentions the Milesian dominance over the sea. Pliny the Elder tells us in his Natural History that the city is 'the mother of more than ninety colonies, founded upon all seas'. As such, the Milesians had a strong navy, while the Lydians, who only gained access to the Aegean Sea with the capture of Priene under Gyges, did not.

On the other hand, the Lydians are renowned for their cavalry. Several poets have mentioned the so-called hippomachoi or horse-fighters. Among them is Bacchylides, who calls the kingdom 'horse-taming Lydia', while Mimnermus describes a Lydian cavalry attack:

His strength and bravery were not like yours, as I have heard from older men who saw him on the plain of Hermos with his spear routing the Lydian cavalry’s thick ranks.

Pallas Athena ne’er had cause to fault his acid fury, when in the front line he hurtled through the battle’s bloody moil against the stinging missiles of the foe.

No warrior of the enemy remained his better in the strenuous work of war, so long as he moved in the swift sun’s light.

These cavalrymen would be perfect for raids into hostile territory, but Herodotus describes an army marching into the Milesian territory. The armies of Miletus and Lydia consisted of the same type of soldiers, hoplites: heavily armoured warriors who usually used a shield and spear. Most Greek soldiers also had a short sword called xiphos. As depicted on a wall-painting in the Tatarli tumulus in Dinar in the Afyonkarahisar Province of Turkey, the Lydian soldiers could have used a curved sword similar to the ancient Egyptian khopesh or the ancient Greek kopis. Another difference between the hoplites of Ionia and those of Lydia is the helmet: whereas the Ionians would wear a helmet similar to the Corinthian helmet, a helmet found in the Lydian capital Sardis is similar to the Phrygian helmet.

== The twelfth year of the war ==
The final year of the war between Lydia and Miletus was the most eventful. According to Herodotus, the Milesians suffered two great defeats during the conflict. The first was the Battle of Limeneion. The location of Limeneion is uncertain, but according to some, it is one of the four harbours of Miletus mentioned by Strabo. The second battle took place in the plain of the Meander river outside the city. This implies the Milesians counter-attacked to chase the Lydians out of their territory. According to some historians, the Lydians eventually besieged Miletus, but others claim this never took place. In any case, the ancient author Frontinus described the siege in his book Strategemata. Polyaenus also wrote on the war.

The most important event of the war was the burning of the temple of Athena at Assesos. During a Lydian raid the crops were set ablaze. The fire spread to the nearby temple, which burned to the ground. Actual archeological evidence for this event has been found at Mengerevtepe. At the time, the Lydians did not realize the significance of this occurrence. Following this, king Alyattes returned to Sardis and fell ill. He sent a messenger to the Delphic oracle to find out the cause of his sickness. The Pythia ordered him to rebuild the temple. Periander, the tyrant of Corinth, heard this news and quickly passed it on to his friend Thrasybulus of Miletus. At the same time, Alyattes heard the oracle and sent a messenger to conduct a truce with Thrasybulus, so he could rebuild the temple.

=== The end of the war ===
When the tyrant of Miletus heard what the messenger from Corinth had to say, he immediately planned a ruse de guerre. Frontinus describes the following in his Strategemata:

The Milesians were at one time suffering a long siege at the hands of Alyattes, who hoped they could be starved into surrender. But the Milesian commander, Thrasybulus, in anticipation of the arrival of envoys from Alyattes, ordered all the grain to be brought together into the market-place, arranged for banquets to be held on that occasion, and provided sumptuous feasts throughout the city. Thus he convinced the enemy that the Milesians had abundance of provisions with which to sustain a long siege.

Herodotus himself uses the word κῶμος to describe the scene. This word can be translated as carousal, a noisy social gathering or party. A. D. Godley made the following translation: "Thrasybulus told the men of Miletus all to drink and celebrate together when he gave the word." Historian and translator George Rawlinson interpreted the passage similarly "[he] issued an order that the Milesians should hold themselves in readiness, and, when he gave the signal, should, one and all, fall to drinking and revelry."

Thrasybulus was known in the ancient world for his shrewdness. Herodotus recounts a story of Periander of Corinth asking Thrasybulus for advice on ruling. Instead of answering outright, the tyrant of Miletus walked into a field and cut off "all such ears of corn overtopping the rest". Periander understood that Thrasybulus meant that a ruler would avoid future problems by removing those who could challenge him. This idea is known as negative selection. Aristotle also mentions this story in his Politica, but reverses the roles.

When Alyattes learned of this apparent surplus of food in Miletus, he quickly sued for peace. A summachia or alliance was formed between the two states. Alyattes rebuilt not one but two temples for Athena at Assesos. This 'twofold restitution' is present in many cultures, and is mentioned in the Bible; but Rawlinson argues that this "was a feature of the religion of Rome. It was not recognised in Greece".

== Aftermath ==
Miletus remained free until at least the reign of Alyattes' son Croesus, who conquered all of Ionia. The city received a special status, and stayed de facto independent. This continued when Croesus was defeated by the Persian king Cyrus the Great and Lydia became a province of the Achaemenid Empire. Eventually, Miletus would play a big role in the Ionian Revolt in 499 BC, which would lead to the Greco-Persian Wars.

Alyattes would go on to conquer Smyrna and wage war against the Medes under Cyaxares, culminating in the Battle of the Eclipse.

== See also ==
- Siege of Miletus
