= Sandakšatru =

King of the Cimmerians
- Reign: 640-c. 630s BC
- Predecessor: Tugdamme
- Successor: Position abolished (Scythian and Lydian defeat of the Cimmerians)
- Died: unknown
- Dynasty: Tugdamme's dynasty
- Religion: Scythian religion (?)

Sandakshatru or Sandakuru (Neo-Assyrian Akkadian: 𒁹𒊓𒀭𒁖𒆳𒊒, romanized: Sandakšatru or Sandakuru) was the last known Cimmerian king.

== Name ==
The name of this Cimmerian king is attested in a form which can be read as either Sandakšatru or Sandakuru, which are derived from a name in a Cimmerian dialect of the Old Iranian Scythian language. The linguist János Harmatta reconstructed this original Cimmerian name as *Sandakuru, meaning "splendid son," while the Scythologist Askold Ivantchik derives the name Sandakšatru from a compound term consisting of the name of the Anatolian deity Šanta, and of the Iranian term -xšaθra, usually translated as "power", "authority", "rule", "control" or similar terms (and cognate with the Indo-Aryan caste name kshatriya).

== Historical background ==
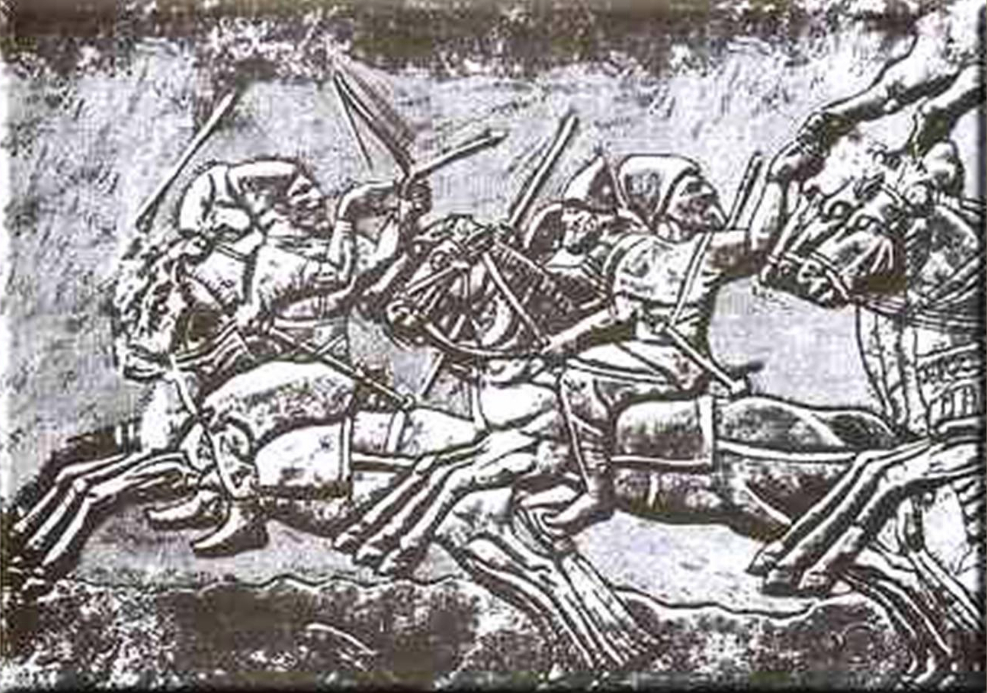
An Assyrian relief depicting Cimmerian mounted warriors

In the 8th and 7th centuries BC, a significant movement of the nomads of the Eurasian steppe brought the Scythians into Southwest Asia. According to Herodotus, this movement started when the Massagetae or the Issedones migrated westwards, forcing the Scythians to the west across the Araxes and into the Caspian Steppe, from where they displaced the Cimmerians.

Under Scythian pressure, the Cimmerians migrated to the south through the Klukhor, Alagir and Darial passes in the Greater Caucasus mountains and reached Western Asia, where they would remain active for much of the 7th century BC.

== Reign ==
Around 680 BC, the Cimmerians separated into two groups, with their bulk having migrated to the west into Anatolia, while a smaller group remained in the east, in the area near the kingdom of Mannai and later migrated into Media.

Sandakšatru was the son of the previous Cimmerian king, Tugdammi, who had led the western Cimmerian group into invading the kingdoms of Phrygia, which was destroyed by the Cimmerians, and Lydia, whose king Gyges died during the invasion of his kingdom, and into several conflicts with the Neo-Assyrian Empire, which was the then superpower in Western Asia. After Tugdammi died of disease in 640 BC, Sandakšatru succeeded his father as the king of the western Cimmerian horde.

After succeeding his father, Sandakšatru attempted to continue Tugdammi's attacks against Assyria but failed just like his father had.

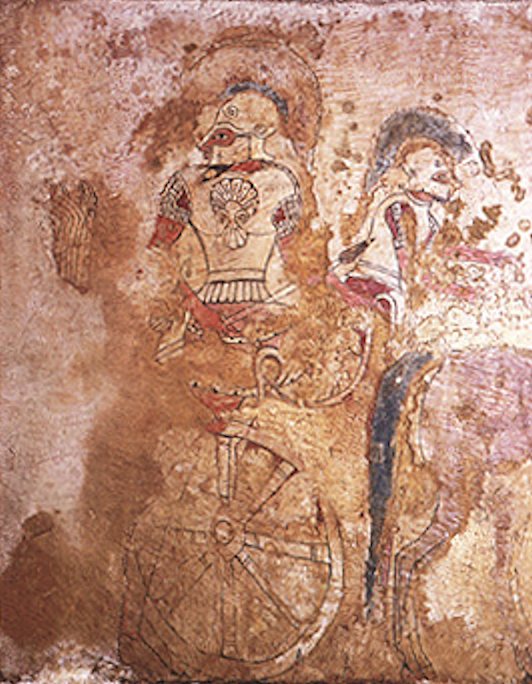
Lycian charioteer warriors.

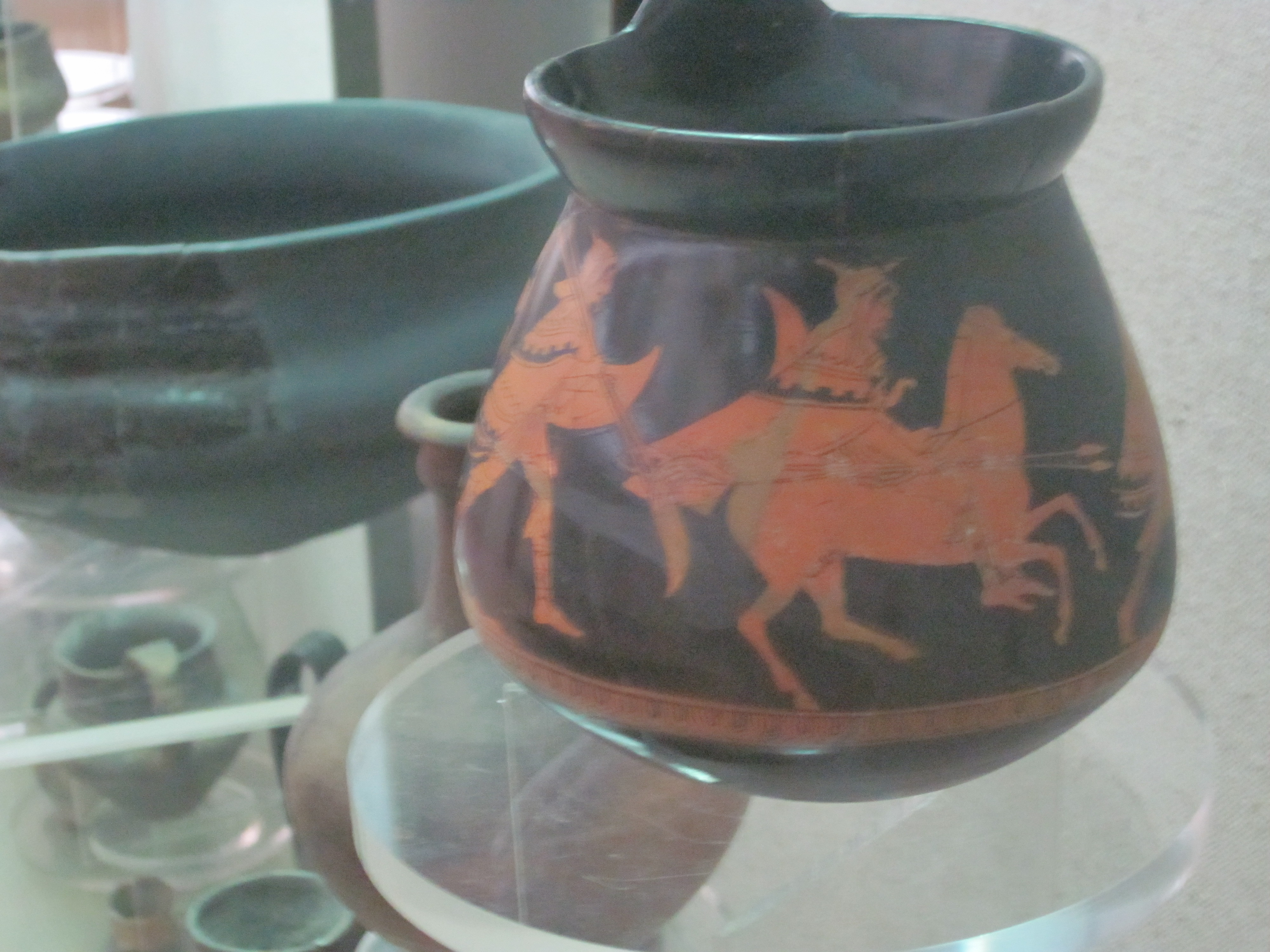
A Thracian mounted warrior followed by a warrior on foot.

=== Attacks on Lydia ===
By the later part of the 7th century BC, the western Cimmerians were nomadising in Western Asia together with the Thracian Treres tribe who had migrated across the Thracian Bosporus and invaded Anatolia. In 637 BC, Sandakšatru's Cimmerians participated in another attack on Lydia, this time led by the Treres under their king Kōbos, and in alliance with the Lycians. During this invasion, in the seventh year of the reign of Gyges's son Ardys, the Lydians were defeated again and for a second time their capital Sardis was captured, except for its citadel, and Ardys might have been killed in this attack. Ardys's son and successor, Sadyattes, might possibly also have been killed in another Cimmerian attack on Lydia.

=== Final defeat of the Cimmerians ===
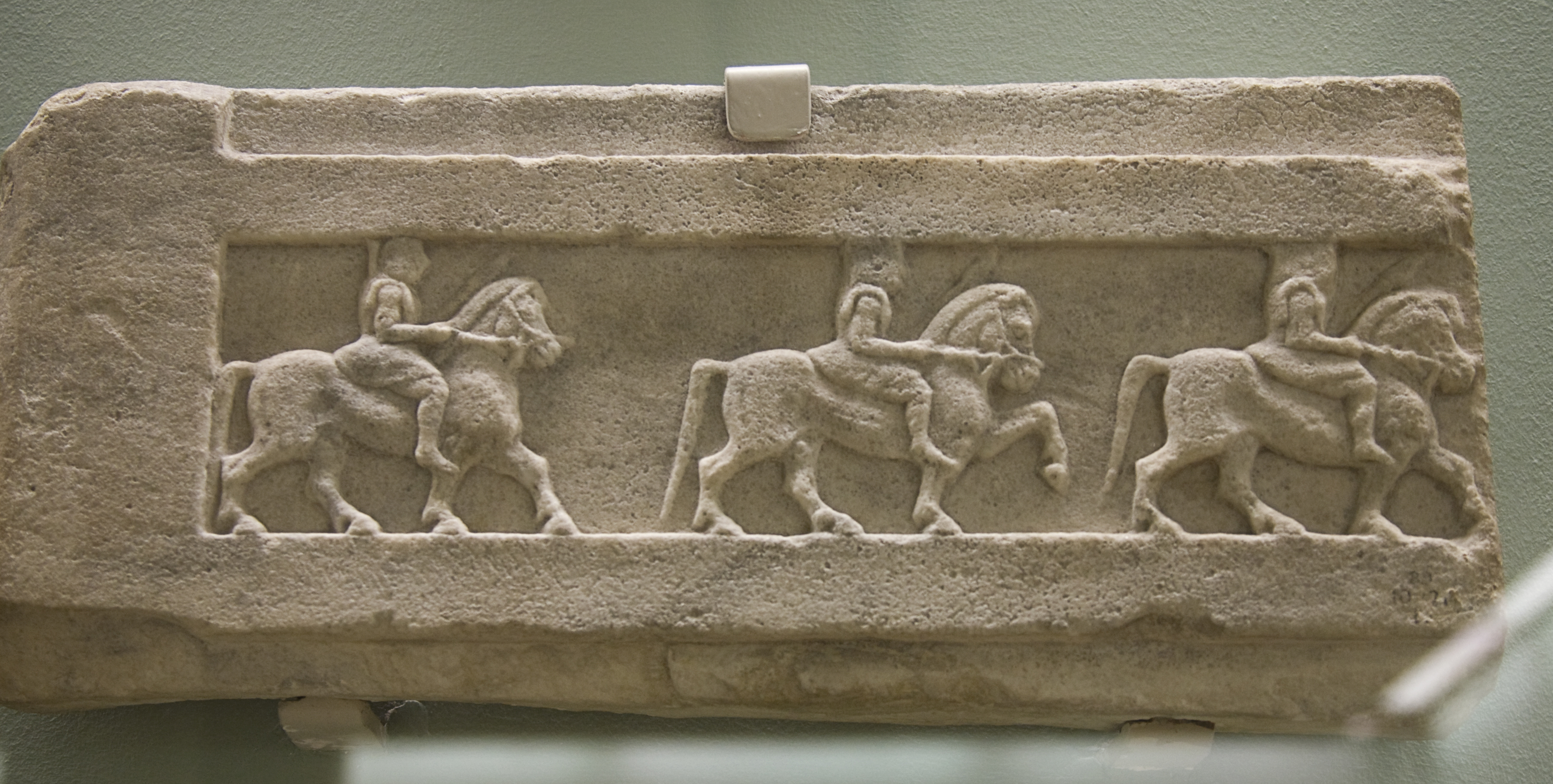
A relief depicting mounted Lydian warriors on slab of marble from a tomb.

The power of the Cimmerians eventually dwindled quickly after Tugdammi's death. Soon after these Cimmerian attacks on Lydia, with Assyrian approval and in alliance with the Lydians, the Assyrians' Scythian allies under their king Madyes entered Anatolia. They expelled the Treres from Asia Minor and defeated the Cimmerians so that they no longer constituted a threat again. Following this, the Scythians extended their domination to Central Anatolia until they were themselves expelled by the Medes from Western Asia in the 600s BC. This final defeat of the Cimmerians was carried out by the joint forces of Madyes, whom Strabo credits with expelling the Treres and Cimmerians from Asia Minor, and of Sadyattes’s son, Ardys’s grandson, and Gyges's great-grandson, the king Alyattes of Lydia, whom Herodotus of Halicarnassus and Polyaenus claim finally defeated the Cimmerians.

=== Aftermath ===
Following this final defeat, the Cimmerians likely remained in the region of Cappadocia, whose name in Armenian, Գամիրք Gamirkʿ, may have been derived from the name of the Cimmerians. A group of Cimmerians might also have subsisted for some time in the Troad, around Antandrus, until they were finally defeated by Alyattes of Lydia. The remnants of the Cimmerians were eventually assimilated by the populations of Anatolia, and they completely disappeared from history after their defeat by Madyes and Alyattes.

== Sources ==
- Diakonoff, I. M. (1985). "Media". In Gershevitch, Ilya (ed.). The Cambridge History of Iran. Vol. 2. Cambridge: Cambridge University Press. pp. 36–148. ISBN 978-0-521-20091-2.
- Ivantchik, Askold (1993). Les Cimmériens au Proche-Orient [The Cimmerians in the Near East] (PDF) (in French). Fribourg, Switzerland; Göttingen, Germany: Éditions Universitaires Fribourg (Switzerland); Vandenhoeck & Ruprecht (Germany). ISBN 978-3-727-80876-0.
- Ivantchik, Askold (2006). Aruz, Joan; Farkas, Ann; Fino, Elisabetta Valtz (eds.). The Golden Deer of Eurasia: Perspectives on the Steppe Nomads of the Ancient World. New Haven, United States; New York City, United States; London, United Kingdom: The Metropolitan Museum of Art; Yale University Press. p. 146-153. ISBN 978-1-588-39205-3.
- Sulimirski, Tadeusz; Taylor, T. F. (1991). "The Scythians". In Boardman, John; Edwards, I. E. S.; Hammond, N. G. L.; Sollberger, E.; Walker, C. B. F. (eds.). The Cambridge Ancient History. Vol. 3. Cambridge: Cambridge University Press. pp. 547–590. ISBN 978-1-139-05429-4.
- Tokhtas’ev, Sergei R. (1991). "CIMMERIANS". Encyclopædia Iranica.

Sandakšatru Tugdamme's dynasty Died: 640 BC
Regnal titles
Preceded by Tugdamme	King of the Cimmerians; 640-c. 635 BC	Succeeded by Office abolished Cimmerians defeated by Scythians and Lydians
