= Pamphila =

Pamphila may refer to:

- Pamphile of Epidaurus, Ancient Greek historian
- Pamphila (butterfly), formerly-recognised genus of butterfly
