= Assesia =

Cultic epithet of the Greek goddess Athena

Assesia (Ancient Greek: Ἀσσησία) was a cultic epithet for the goddess Athena in Greek mythology, derived from the town of Assesos in Ionia, where she had a temple.

The historian Herodotus relates several anecdotes about this aspect of the goddess, as having a temple at Assesos that was accidentally burned down by the forces of the 7th century BCE Mermnad king Alyattes I, while his forces were waging war against the Milesians, and burning all their grain. After falling ill, the king consulted the Pythia, who told him no answer would be forthcoming until the temple was rebuilt, which Alyattes did, ultimately building two temples to Athena Assesia.

The ruin of one of these temples still exists today, and is a significant source of south Ionian pottery for modern scholars.
