= Xenophilus (historian) =

Xenophilus (Greek: Ξενόφιλος), sometimes Xenophilos of Sardeis, was a Greek writer who wrote a history of Lydia. His dates are unknown. He was active after about 600 BC. Harry Brewster places him in the 3rd century BC. He may be the Zenophilos (Ζηνόφιλος) cited as a source in Antigonus of Carystus's paraphrase of Callimachus. If so, he lived no later than the first half of the 3rd century (Callimachus' time).

His Lydian Histories (Greek: Λυδικαὶ ἱστορίαι, Lydikaì historíai) is a lost work, known only from its citation in the anonymous Treatise on Famous Women in War. This single fragment informs the reader that Sadyattes, the king of Lydia between about 625 and 600, married his own sister, Lyde, and together they had a son, Alyattes, who succeeded his father on the throne. When Alyattes was violent and rude in his youth, Lyde "requited with noble words and deeds" those he wronged. She feigned illness so that her son would wait on her and he "was restrained and changed so that, as [Xenophilus] says, he became the most just and honest of men."

Given the similarity between the only surviving fragment of Xenophilus' lost history and the corresponding passages in the surviving fragments of the history of Nicholas of Damascus, who used Xanthus' Lydian history as a source, scholars have argued that Xanthus was also Xenophilus' source.
