= Xenophilus =

Xenophilus or Xenophilos may refer to:

- Xenophilus (5th century BC), playwright who won the Lenaia with a comedy
- Xenophilus (philosopher) (4th century BC), Pythagorean philosopher and music theorist
- Xenophilus (phrourarch) (4th century BC), Macedonian governor of Susa
- Xenophilus (historian) (3rd century BC), author of a lost history of Lydia
- Xenophilus (bacterium), genus
