= Onomaris =

Celtic queen

- Era: c. 4th century BCE

Onomaris was a Celtic queen regnant. She is described in the anonymous collection of Greek stories known in Latin as Tractatus de mulieribus claris in dello. She is the first Celtic woman mentioned by name in classical records.

According to this text source, her people, suffering from scarcity and needing to flee their land, offered to obey anyone willing to lead them. When no man accepted the offer, Onomaris pooled their resources and led the emigration into southeastern Europe. Onomaris crossed the Ister and ruled over the land after defeating the local inhabitants in battle. She is estimated to have lived at around the 4th century BC. She was honored by the Galatians for her feats. However, the historical circumstances of her life are unknown, so it is unclear if she was a real person or a legendary character.

== Name ==
The name Onomaris sounds like a Greek word but it appears to be a compound, with the second element “-maris” reflecting a Celtic root that meant “great”. It may also mean “mountain ash”, or possibly “like a great mountain ash or rowan tree”. It is also suggested that the on or on(n)o in her name meant “river,” aligning with her story leading a river crossing. In another possible etymology is comes from the element "-ris", which could be related to "-rix," meaning "king".
