= Teušpâ =

King of the Cimmerians
- Reign: Unknown - 679 BC
- Successor: Dugdammē
- Died: 679 BC
- Religion: Scythian religion (?)

Teušpâ (Neo-Assyrian Akkadian: 𒁹𒋼𒍑𒉺𒀀, romanized: Teušpâ, and 𒁹𒋼𒍑𒉺 Teušpa) was an early 7th-century BC king of the Cimmerians.

== Name ==
Teušpa and Teušpâ are Akkadian forms of a name which originates from a Cimmerian dialect of the Old Iranian Scythian language.

The linguist János Harmatta reconstructed this original Cimmerian name as *Tavispaya, which means "swelling with strength."

Askold Ivantchik instead proposes three alternative suggestions for an Old Iranian origin of Teušpâ:

- *Taiu-aspa "abductor of horses"
- *Taiu-spā "abductor dog"
- *Daiva-spā "divine dog"

Despite the apparent similarity of Teušpâ's name with that of his Persian contemporary Teispēs (Cišpiš), they do not seem to be etymologically related.

== Historical background ==
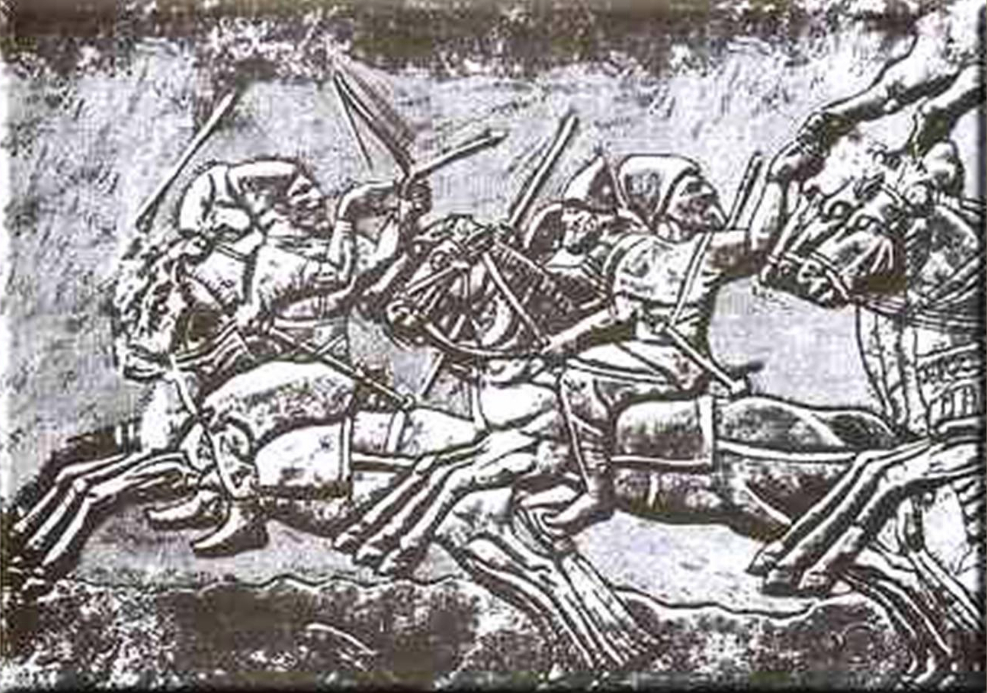
An Assyrian relief depicting Cimmerian mounted warriors

In the 8th and 7th centuries BC, a significant movement of the nomads of the Eurasian steppe brought the Scythians into Southwest Asia. According to Herodotus, this movement started when the Massagetae or the Issedones migrated westwards, forcing the Scythians to the west across the Araxes and into the Caspian Steppe, from where they displaced the Cimmerians.

Under Scythian pressure, the Cimmerians migrated to the south through the Klukhor, Alagir and Darial passes in the Greater Caucasus mountains and reached Western Asia, where they would remain active for much of the 7th century BCE.

== Reign ==
Around 680 BC, the Cimmerians separated into two groups, with their bulk having migrated into Anatolia, while a smaller group remained in the area near the kingdom of Mannai and later migrated into Media.

Teušpâ was the king of the western Cimmerian horde, who had moved into Anatolia. In 679 BC, Teušpâ led a Cimmerian incursion against the western borderlands of the Neo-Assyrian Empire and was defeated and killed by the Assyrian king Esarhaddon near Ḫubušna in Cappadocia. Despite this victory, the military operations of the Assyrians were not fully successful and they were not able to firmly occupy the areas around Ḫubušna, nor were they able to secure their borders.

== Sources ==
- Diakonoff, I. M. (1985). "Media". In Gershevitch, Ilya (ed.). The Cambridge History of Iran: Volume. Vol. 2. Cambridge: Cambridge University Press. ISBN 978-0-521-20091-2.
- Sulimirski, Tadeusz; Taylor, T. F. (1991). "The Scythians". In Boardman, John; Edwards, I. E. S.; Hammond, N. G. L.; Sollberger, E.; Walker, C. B. F. (eds.). The Cambridge Ancient History. Vol. 3. Cambridge: Cambridge University Press. pp. 547–590. ISBN 978-1-139-05429-4.
- Ivantchik, Askold (1993). Les Cimmériens au Proche-Orient [The Cimmerians in the Near East] (PDF) (in French). Fribourg, Switzerland; Göttingen, Germany: Éditions Universitaires Fribourg (Switzerland); Vandenhoeck & Ruprecht (Germany). ISBN 978-3-727-80876-0.
- Tokhtas’ev, Sergei R. (1991). "CIMMERIANS". Encyclopædia Iranica.

Teušpâ Died: 679 BCE
Regnal titles
Unknown	King of the Cimmerians unknown-679 BCE	Succeeded by Dugdammē
