= Glaucus of Chios =

Ancient Greek sculptor and metalsmith

Glaucus of Chios (Ancient Greek: Γλαῦκος) was a Greek metal sculptor from the island of Chios, who is often distinguished as the inventor of the art of soldering metals (Greek: σιδήρου κόλλησις, lit. "gluing together of iron").

His most noted work was a base of welded iron supporting a silver krater. According to Herodotus, it was given by Alyattes, the Lydian King and father of Croesus, to the Oracle of Delphi. The base, perhaps already without the krater, was also seen by Pausanias, who describes its construction, and by Athenaeus, who says that it was chased with small figures of animals, insects, and plants. Perhaps it is this passage that has led Meyer and others into the mistake of explaining κόλλησις as that kind of engraving on steel which is now called damascene work. Actually there is no doubt that κόλλησις meant a mode of uniting metals without the help of nails, hooks, or dovetails. Plutarch also speaks of this salver as very celebrated.

The proverb Γλαύκου τέχνη ("the skill of Glaucus"), purported by some to refer to Glaucus of Chios, could also refer to a writing technique invented by Glaucus of Samos. Cf. Stephanus Byzantinus (s. v. Αἰθάλη) and Suda (s. v. γλαῦξ ἴπταται), who appear to confuse these two persons of the name Glaucus. A scholiast on Plato identifies the two.

Glaucus is placed by Eusebius at the 2nd year of the 22nd Olympiad (691 BC). Alyattes reigned 617–560 BC. Though these dates appear inconsistent, there is nothing in Herodotus to exclude the supposition that the iron base had been made some time before Alyattes sent it to Delphi.

== Sources ==
- Herodotus. The Histories. Penguin Classics, 1996, p. 11.
- Realencyclopädie der Classischen Altertumswissenschaft, Band VII, Halbband 13, Fornax-Glykon (1910), pp. 1421–1422
