= Soteridas of Epidaurus =

Soteridas of Epidaurus (Greek: Σωτηρίδας ὁ Ἐπιδαύριος; 1st century) was a grammarian and the husband of Pamphile. He wrote a work on Orthography, Homeric Enquiries, a Commentary on Menander, On Metres, On Comedy, and a Commentary on Euripides. Pamphile's historical work was ascribed by some to him. The Suda has two articles on Soteridas which so nearly resemble each other that there can be little doubt that they are the same person. In the second entry, Soteridas is described as the father of Pamphile.
