= Treres =

Thracian tribe

The Treres (Ancient Greek: Τρῆρες, romanized: Trêres; Latin: Trēres) or Trares (Ancient Greek: Τρᾶρες, romanized: Trâres) were a Thracian tribe, of whom a part invaded Anatolia in the 7th century BCE, while another part lived in Thrace and Illyria.

== History ==
=== In Anatolia ===
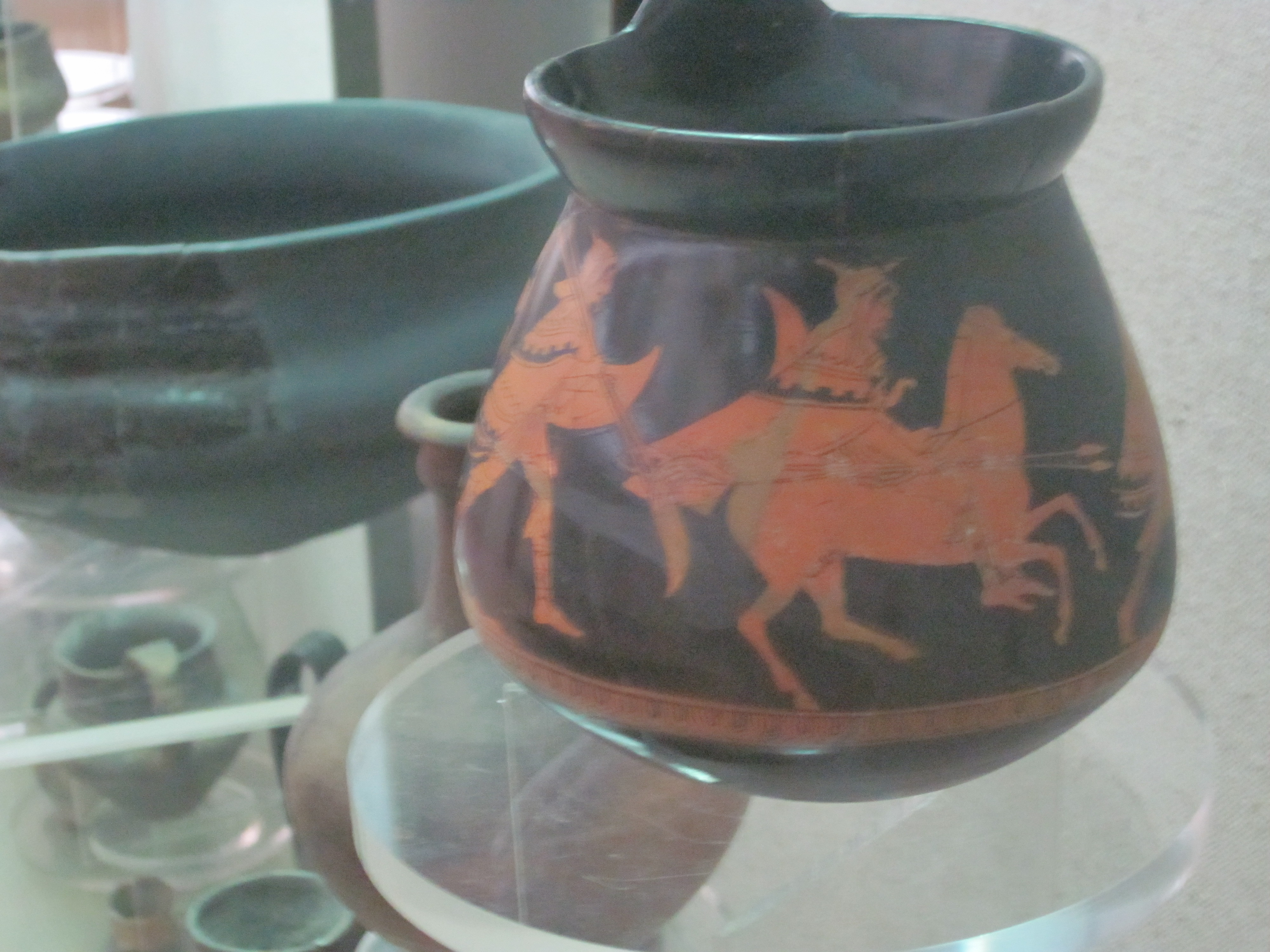
A Thracian mounted warrior followed by a warrior on foot.

Around the c. 660s BCE, the Treres migrated across the Thracian Bosporus and invaded Anatolia from the north-west, after which they allied with the Cimmerians, who were a nomadic Iranic people originating in the Eurasian Steppe who had themselves invaded Anatolia from the east in the middle of the preceding 8th century BCE.

From around the c. 650s BCE, the Treres were nomadising in Anatolia along with the Cimmerians.

==== Invasion of Lydia ====
In 644 BCE, the Treres under their king Kōbos (Κῶβος), along with the Cimmerians under their king Lygdamis, and in alliance with the Lycians or Lycaonians, attacked the kingdom of Lydia: they defeated the Lydians and captured their capital city of Sardis except for its citadel, and the Lydian king Gyges was killed during this attack.

==== Invasion of Asian Greece ====
After sacking Sardis, Lydgamis and Kōbos led the Cimmerians and the Treres into invading the Greek city-states of the Troad, Aeolia and Ionia on the western coast of Anatolia, where they destroyed the city of Magnesia on the Meander as well as the Artemision of Ephesus. The city of Colophon joined Ephesus and Magnesia in resisting this invasion.

The Cimmerians and Treres remained on the western coast of Anatolia inhabited by the Greeks for three years, from c. 644 to c. 641 BCE, where later Greek tradition claimed that Lygdamis had occupied Antandros and Priene, which forced a large number of the inhabitants of the coastal region called Batinētis to flee to the islands of the Aegean Sea.

==== Activities in Cilicia ====
Sensing the exhaustion of Neo-Assyrian power following the suppression of a revolt by the Babylonian king Šamaš-šuma-ukin over the course of 652 to 648 BCE, the Cimmerians and Treres moved to Cilicia on the north-west border of the Neo-Assyrian Empire in c. 640 BCE itself, immediately after their third invasion of Lydia and the attack on the Asian Greek cities. There, Lygdamis allied with the king of the then rebellious Assyrian vassal state of Tabal, Mussi, to attack the Neo-Assyrian Empire.

Although the Urartians had sent tribute to the Neo-Assyrian Empire in 643 BCE, the Urartian king Sarduri III (r. c. 645 – c. 625 BCE), who had been a Neo-Assyrian vassal, was at this time also forced to accept the suzerainty of the Treres' Cimmerian allies.

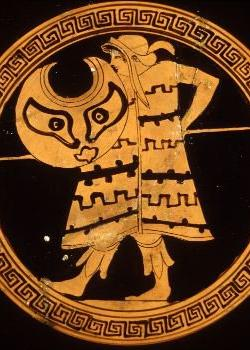
A Thracian warrior.

However, Mussi died before the planned attack on Neo-Assyrian Empire and his kingdom collapsed when its elite fled or was deported to Assyria, while Lygdamis carried it out but failed because, according to Neo-Assyrian sources, he became ill and fire broke out in his camp. Following this, Lygdamis was faced with a revolt against himself, after which ended his hostilities against the Neo-Assyrian Empire and sent tribute to the Neo-Assyrian king Ashurbanipal to form an alliance with him, while Ashurbanipal forced Lygdamis to swear an oath to not attack the Neo-Assyrian Empire.

===== Death of Lygdamis =====
Lygdamis soon broke his oath and attacked the Neo-Assyrian Empire again, but during his military campaign he contracted a grave illness whose symptoms included paralysis of half of his body and vomiting of blood as well as gangrene of the genitals, and he consequently committed suicide in 640 BCE in Cilicia itself.

Lygdamis was succeeded as king of the Cimmerians in Cilicia by his son Sandakšatru, who continued Lygdamis's attacks against the Neo-Assyrian Empire but failed just like his father.

The power of the Cimmerians dwindled quickly after the death of Lygdamis, although the Lydian kings Ardys and Sadyattes might however have either died fighting the Cimmerians or were deposed for being incapable of efficiently fighting them, respectively in c. 637 and c. 635 BCE.

==== Defeat ====
Around c. 635 BCE, and with Neo-Assyrian approval, the Scythians under their king Madyes entered Central Anatolia and defeated the Cimmerians and Treres. This final defeat of the Cimmerians was carried out by the joint forces of Madyes's Scythians, whom Strabo of Amasia credits with expelling the Treres from Asia Minor, and of the Lydians led by their king Alyattes, who was himself the son of Sadyattes as well as the grandson of Ardys and the great-grandson of Gyges, whom Herodotus of Halicarnassus and Polyaenus of Bithynia claim permanently defeated the Cimmerians so that they no longer constituted a threat.

=== In Thrace ===
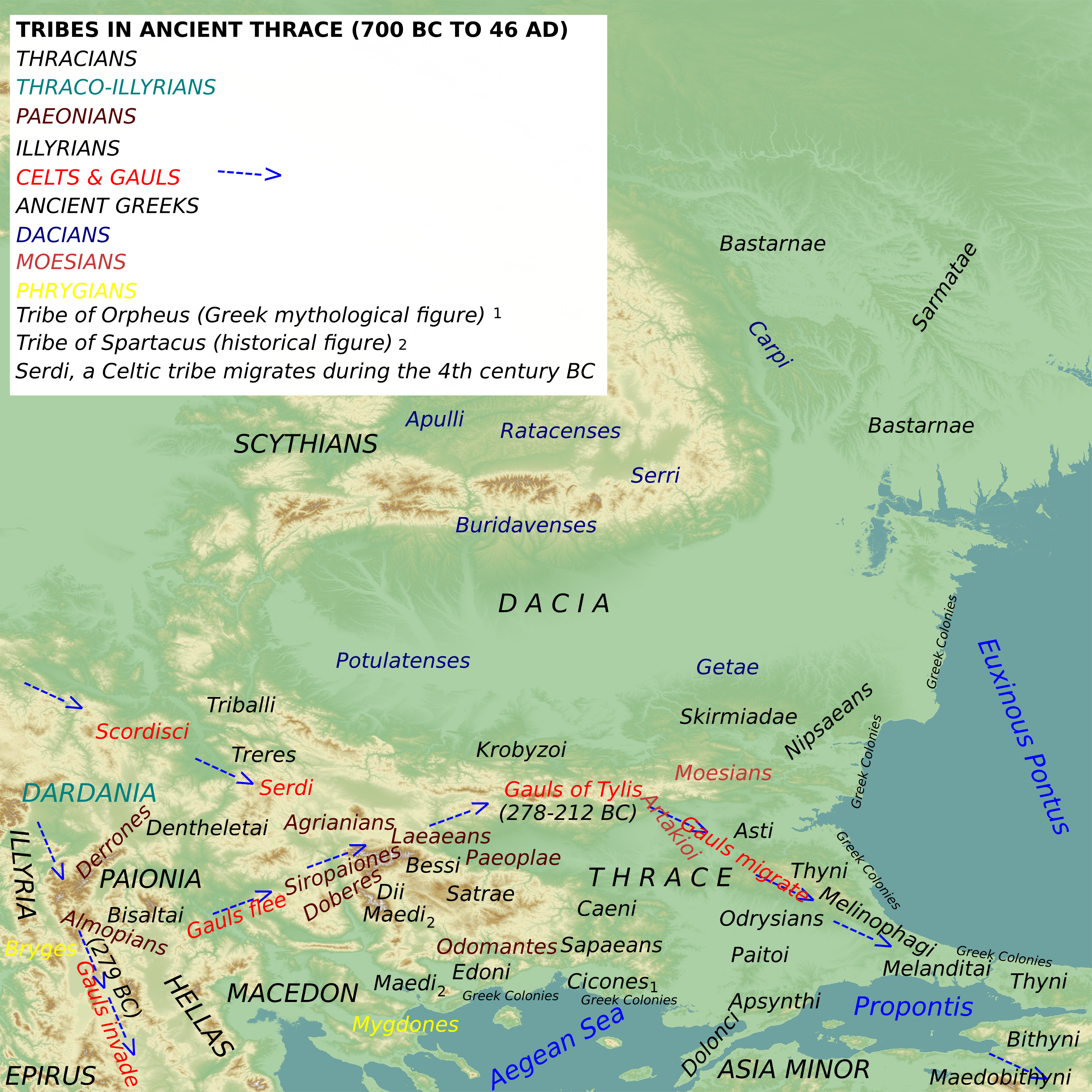
Location of the Treres among the Thracian tribes.

Another group of Treres lived in Thrace, although their relation with those who had invaded Anatolia is unclear:

- according to one hypothesis, they were completely unrelated to the Treres who invaded Anatolia;
- another hypothesis is that these European Treres might have been the same ones who had previously invaded Anatolia, and who after being defeated by Alyattes had fled to Thrace.

==== In northwestern Thrace ====
One section of the European Treres lived in north-west Thrace, more specifically in the northwestern borderlands of the Odrysian kingdom, where they occupied the region of Serdica to the north of mount Scombrus and the west of the Oescus river along with the Tilataei. The Treres and Tilataei had the Triballi as their western neighbours.

In the 4th century BCE, the Triballi migrated to the east and assimilated the Treres and Tilataei, who consequently disappeared from history. By the late 1st century BCE, the territory of the Treres and Tilataei was occupied by the Thraco-Celtic tribe of the Serdi.

==== In southern Thrace ====
Strabo of Amasia also claimed that another group of Treres were among the Thracian tribes who lived around Lake Bistonis in southern Thrace.

=== In Illyria ===
Pliny the Elder also referred to a group of the Treres who lived in southeastern Illyria, and, alongside the Dardani and Pieres, were located near the boundary of the Macedonian kingdom from which the river Axios flowed into it at the time of Philip II and Alexander III.

== See also ==
- Bithyni
- Thyni

== Sources ==
- Adalı, Selim Ferruh (2017). "Cimmerians and the Scythians: the Impact of Nomadic Powers on the Assyrian Empire and the Ancient Near East". In Kim, Hyun Jin; Vervaet, Frederik Juliaan; Adalı, Selim Ferruh (eds.). Eurasian Empires in Antiquity and the Early Middle Ages Contact and Exchange between the Graeco- Roman World, Inner Asia and China. Cambridge, United Kingdom: Cambridge University Press. pp. 60–82. ISBN 978-1-107-19041-2.
- Adalı, Selim Ferruh (2023). "The Phantom Menace? The Chronology of Cimmerian Expeditions, Territories and Zones of Influence in Anatolia". In Draycott, Catherine M.; Branting, Scott; Lehner, Joseph W.; Özarslan, Yasemin (eds.). From Midas to Cyrus and Other Stories: Papers on Iron Age Anatolia in Honour of Geoffrey and Françoise Summers. BIAA Monograph Series. London, United Kingdom: British Institute at Ankara. pp. 209–228. ISBN 978-1-912-09011-2.
- Bouzek, Jan [in Hungarian] (2001). "Cimmerians and Early Scythians: the Transition from Geometric to Orientalising Style in the Pontic Area". In Tsetskhladze, G.R. (ed.). North Pontic Archaeology: Recent Discoveries and Studies. Leiden, Netherlands: Brill Publishers. pp. 33–44. ISBN 978-9-004-12041-9.
- Braun, T. F. R. G. (1982). "The Greeks in Egypt". In Boardman, John; Hammond, N. G. L. (eds.). The Expansion of the Greek World, Eighth to Sixth Centuries B.C. The Cambridge Ancient History. Vol. 3. Cambridge, United Kingdom: Cambridge University Press. pp. 32–56. ISBN 978-0-521-23447-4.
- Cook, J. M. (1982). "The Eastern Greeks". In Boardman, John; Hammond, N. G. L. (eds.). The Expansion of the Greek World, Eighth to Sixth Centuries B.C. The Cambridge Ancient History. Vol. 3. Cambridge, United Kingdom: Cambridge University Press. pp. 196–221. ISBN 978-0-521-23447-4.
- Cunliffe, Barry (2019). The Scythians: Nomad Warriors of the Steppe. Oxford, United Kingdom: Oxford University Press. ISBN 978-0-198-82012-3.
- Dale, Alexander (2015). "WALWET and KUKALIM: Lydian coin legends, dynastic succession, and the chronology of Mermnad kings". Kadmos. 54: 151–166. doi:10.1515/kadmos-2015-0008. S2CID 165043567.
- de Boer, Jan (2006). "The Cimmerian invasions in Anatolia and the earliest Greek colonies in the Black Sea area". Eirene. Studia Graeca et Latina. 42: 43–55.
- de Boer, Jan (2021). "The 'Western Cimmerians' and the first Greek settlers in the Troad". In Tsetskhladze, Gocha R.; Avram, Alexandru; Hargrave, James (eds.). The Greeks and Romans in the Black Sea and the Importance of the Pontic Region for the Graeco-Roman World (7th century BC - 5th century AD): 20 Years On (1997-2017): Proceedings of the Sixth International Congress on Black Sea Antiquities (Constanța - 18-22 September 2017). Oxford, United Kingdom: Archaeopress Publishing Limited. pp. 20–26. ISBN 978-1-789-69759-9.
- Diakonoff, I. M. (1985). "Media". In Gershevitch, Ilya (ed.). The Cambridge History of Iran. Vol. 2. Cambridge, United Kingdom: Cambridge University Press. pp. 36–148. ISBN 978-0-521-20091-2.
- Fuchs, Andreas [in German] (2023). "The Medes and the Kingdom of Mannea". In Radner, Karen; Moeller, Nadine; Potts, Daniel T. (eds.). The Age of Assyria. The Oxford History of the Ancient Near East. Vol. 4. New York City, United States: Oxford University Press. pp. 674–768. ISBN 978-0-190-68763-2.
- Graham, A. J. (1982). "The colonial expansion of Greece". In Boardman, John; Hammond, N. G. L. (eds.). The Expansion of the Greek World, Eighth to Sixth Centuries B.C. The Cambridge Ancient History. Vol. 3. Cambridge, United Kingdom: Cambridge University Press. pp. 83–162. ISBN 978-0-521-23447-4.
- Grousset, René (1970). The Empire of the Steppes: A History of Central Asia. Translated by Walford, Naomi. New Brunswick, United States: Rutgers University Press. ISBN 978-0-813-51304-1.
- Harmatta, János (1996). "10.4.1. The Scythians". In Hermann, Joachim; Zürcher, Erik; Harmatta, János; Litvak, J. K.; Lonis, R. [in French]; Obenga, T.; Thapar, R.; Zhou, Yiliang [in Chinese] (eds.). From the Seventh Century B.C. to the Seventh Century A.D. History of Humanity. Vol. 3. London, United Kingdom; New York City, United States; Paris, France: Routledge; UNESCO. pp. 181–182. ISBN 978-9-231-02812-0.
- Hawkins, J. D. [in German] (1982). "The Neo-Hittite States in Syria and Anatolia". In Boardman, John; Edwards, I. E. S.; Hammond, N. G. L.; Sollberger, E. (eds.). The Prehistory of the Balkans; and the Middle East and the Aegean world, tenth to eighth centuries B.C. The Cambridge Ancient History. Vol. 3. Cambridge, United Kingdom: Cambridge University Press. pp. 372–441. ISBN 978-1-139-05428-7.
- Ivantchik, Askold (1993a). Les Cimmériens au Proche-Orient [The Cimmerians in the Near East] (PDF) (in French). Fribourg, Switzerland; Göttingen, Germany: Éditions Universitaires Fribourg (Switzerland); Vandenhoeck & Ruprecht (Germany). ISBN 978-3-727-80876-0.
- Ivantchik, Askold (1993b). "LES GUERRIERS-CHIENS: Loups-garous et invasions scythes en Asie Mineure" [The Dog Warriors: Werewolves and Scythian invasions in Asia Minor]. Revue de l'histoire des religions [Review of the History of Religions]. 210 (3): 305–330. doi:10.3406/rhr.1993.1478. JSTOR 23671794.
- Ivantchik, Askold (1999). "The Scythian 'Rule Over Asia': the Classical Tradition and the Historical Reality". In Tsetskhladze, G.R. (ed.). Ancient Greeks West and East. Leiden, Netherlands: Brill. pp. 497–520. ISBN 978-9-004-11190-5.
- Ivantchik, Askold (2006). Aruz, Joan [in French]; Farkas, Ann; Fino, Elisabetta Valtz (eds.). The Golden Deer of Eurasia: Perspectives on the Steppe Nomads of the Ancient World. New Haven, United States; New York City, United States; London, United Kingdom: The Metropolitan Museum of Art; Yale University Press. pp. 146–153. ISBN 978-1-588-39205-3.
- Ivantchik, Askold (2018). "Scythians". Encyclopædia Iranica. New York City, United States: Encyclopædia Iranica Foundation; Brill Publishers.
- Kõiv, Mait [in Estonian] (2022). "Lydia, Phrygia and the Cimmerians: Mesopotamian and Greek evidence combined". In Mattila, Raija [in Finnish]; Fink, Sebastian; Ito, Sanae (eds.). Evidence Combined: Western and Eastern Sources in Dialogue. Melammu Symposia. Vol. 11. Vienna, Austria: Austrian Academy of Sciences Press. pp. 261–294. ISBN 978-3-700-18573-4.
- Mellink, M. (1991). "The Native Kingdoms of Anatolia". In Boardman, John; Edwards, I. E. S.; Hammond, N. G. L.; Sollberger, E.; Walker, C. B. F. (eds.). The Assyrian and Babylonian Empires and other States of the Near East, from the Eighth to the Sixth Centuries B.C. The Cambridge Ancient History. Vol. 3. Cambridge, United Kingdom: Cambridge University Press. pp. 619–665. ISBN 978-1-139-05429-4.
- Mihailov, G. [in Bulgarian] (1991). "Thrace Before the Persian Entry into Europe". In Boardman, John; Edwards, I. E. S.; Hammond, N. G. L.; Sollberger, E.; Walker, C. B. F. (eds.). The Assyrian and Babylonian Empires and other States of the Near East, from the Eighth to the Sixth Centuries B.C. The Cambridge Ancient History. Vol. 3. Cambridge, United Kingdom: Cambridge University Press. pp. 591–618. ISBN 978-1-139-05429-4.
- Olbrycht, Marek Jan [in Polish] (2000a). "The Cimmerian Problem Re-Examined: the Evidence of the Classical Sources". In Pstrusińska, Jadwiga [in Polish]; Fear, Andrew (eds.). Collectanea Celto-Asiatica Cracoviensia. Kraków: Księgarnia Akademicka. pp. 71–100. ISBN 978-8-371-88337-8.
- Parzinger, Hermann (2004). Die Skythen [The Scythians] (in German). Munich, Germany: Verlag C.H.Beck. ISBN 978-3-406-50842-4.
- Phillips, E. D. (1972). "The Scythian Domination in Western Asia: Its Record in History, Scripture and Archaeology". World Archaeology. 4 (2): 129–138. doi:10.1080/00438243.1972.9979527. JSTOR 123971.
- Spalinger, Anthony J. [in German] (1978). "The Date of the Death of Gyges and Its Historical Implications". Journal of the American Oriental Society. 98 (4): 400–409. doi:10.2307/599752. JSTOR 599752.
- Sulimirski, Tadeusz; Taylor, T. F. (1991). "The Scythians". In Boardman, John; Edwards, I. E. S.; Hammond, N. G. L.; Sollberger, E.; Walker, C. B. F. (eds.). The Assyrian and Babylonian Empires and other States of the Near East, from the Eighth to the Sixth Centuries B.C. The Cambridge Ancient History. Vol. 3. Cambridge, United Kingdom: Cambridge University Press. pp. 547–590. ISBN 978-1-139-05429-4.
- Tokhtas’ev, Sergei R. [in Russian] (1991). "Cimmerians". Encyclopædia Iranica. New York City, United States: Encyclopædia Iranica Foundation; Brill Publishers.
- von Bredow, Iris [in German] (2002). "Treres". In Salazar, Christine F.; Cancik, Hubert [in German]; Schneider, Helmuth [in German]; Bachmann, Cordula; Barkowski, Kim; Chronopoulos, Tina; van Eijndhoven, David; Imhausen, Annette; van der Mije, Sebastiaan R.; Op de Coul, Michiel; Ruppel, Antonia; Vetter, Barbara (eds.). Brill's New Pauly: Encyclopaedia of the Ancient World. Vol. 14. Leiden, Netherlands; Boston, United States: Brill. p. 890. ISBN 978-9-004-14219-0.
- Xydopoulos, Ioannis K. (2015). "The Cimmerians: their origins, movements and their difficulties". In Tsetskhladze, Gocha R.; Avram, Alexandru; Hargrave, James (eds.). The Danubian Lands Between the Black, Aegean and Adriatic Seas (7th Century BC-10th Century AD): Proceedings of the Fifth International Congress on Black Sea Antiquities (Belgrade - 17-21 September 2013). Oxford, United Kingdom: Archaeopress Publishing Limited. pp. 119–123. ISBN 978-1-784-91192-8.
