= Assesos =

Town of ancient Caria

Assesos or Assesus (Ancient Greek: Ἀσσησός) was a small ancient Greek town in the region of Caria in Asia Minor, in the territory of Miletus, and the site of a sanctuary of Athena Assesia (Ancient Greek: Ἀσσησία Ἀθηνᾶ). It is mentioned by Herodotus in his Histories (I.18–23) in the context of an episode during the war between the Lydians under Sadyattes and the Milesians in the late 7th century BC, when Lydian troops destroyed the sanctuary with fire. Herodotus also writes that after a peace, Alyattes of Lydia built two temples dedicated to Athena at the city, following the advice of the Pythia.

The site of the ancient settlement has been identified by archaeologists at the modern location Mengerev Tepe, some 7 km south-east of ancient Miletus. Assesos was discovered on Mengerev Tepe in 1992.
