= Pamphile of Epidaurus =

Egyptian-Greek historian (1st century AD)

Pamphile or Pamphila of Epidaurus (Note: Ancient Greek: Παμφίλη ἡ Ἐπιδαυρία, Pamphílē hē Epidauría) (fl. 1st century AD) was an Egyptian historian who lived in Greece during the reign of the Roman emperor Nero (ruled 54 – 68 AD) and wrote in Greek. She was the first known female Greco-Roman historian and, along with Ban Zhao, one of the first known female historians. She is best known for her lost Historical Commentaries, a collection of miscellaneous historical anecdotes in thirty-three books, which is frequently cited by the Roman writer Aulus Gellius (c. 125 – after 180 AD) in his Attic Nights and by the Greek biographer Diogenes Laërtius in his Lives and Opinions of Eminent Philosophers. She is also described in the tenth-century Byzantine encyclopedia, the Suda, and by the Byzantine writer Photios (c. 810/820 – 893). According to the Suda, she wrote a large number of epitomes of the works of other historians as well as treatises on disputes and sex. She may be the author of the anonymous surviving Greek treatise Tractatus de mulieribus claris in bello, which gives brief biographical accounts of the lives of famous women.

== Background ==
According to the Suda, a Byzantine encyclopedia of the tenth century AD, Pamphile was an Epidaurian, whereas Photios describes her as an Egyptian by birth or descent. Various scholars have made suggestions to explain this apparent discrepancy, of which Antonella Ippolito judges the suggestion that the family were of Egyptian descent but moved to Epidaurus the most plausible. Based on Photios' chronology, Pamphile was born between 20 and 30 AD.

Photios summarizes the preface to Pamphile's Historical Notes, which states that, during the thirteen years she had lived with her husband, from whom she was never absent for a single hour, she was constantly at work upon her book, and that she diligently wrote down whatever she heard from her husband and from the many other learned people who frequented their house, as well as whatever she herself read in books.

The Suda contradicts itself over whether the grammarian Soteridas of Epidaurus was Pamphile's father or her husband. In one passage, the Suda speaks of Pamphile as the daughter of Soteridas and the wife of Socratidas, but in another passage she is described as the wife of Soteridas. Gudeman concludes that it is more likely that the first passage is correct and that Soteridas was Pamphile's father. The Suda credits Soteridas as the true author of Pamphile's Historical Commentaries. Modern scholars believe that he may have played a significant role in writing it. The Suda also credits Soteridas as the author of numerous treatises on philology and grammar, including a treatise on "Homeric problems", a commentary of Euripides and Menander, a treatise on comedy, a treatise on orthography, and a treatise on poetic meter.

== Writings ==
Pamphile's best-known work was the Historical Commentaries, a collection of historical anecdotes comprising thirty-three books. Ten fragments survive, quoted by Diogenes Laertius and Aulus Gellius. The estimation in which it was held in antiquity is shown by the extensive references to it in the works of the Roman historian Aulus Gellius and the Greek biographer Diogenes Laërtius, who appear to have availed themselves of it to a considerable extent. Photios gives a general idea of the nature of its contents. The work was not arranged according to subjects or according to any settled plan, but it was more like a commonplace book, in which each piece of information was set down as it fell under the notice of the writer, who stated that she believed this variety would give greater pleasure to the reader. Photios considers the work as one of great use, and supplying important information on many points in history and literature. Photios speaks only of eight books but the Suda says that it consisted of thirty-three. The latter must be correct, since we find Gellius quoting the eleventh and twenty-ninth, and Diogenes Laërtius the twenty-fifth and thirty-second. Perhaps no more than eight books were extant in the time of Photios. The work is also referred to by Diogenes Laërtius in other passages.

Besides the history already mentioned, the Suda says she also wrote an Epitome of Ctesias in 3 books; a very large number of epitomes of histories and other books; On Disputes; On Sex; and many other works.

== Tractatus de mulieribus claris in bello ==
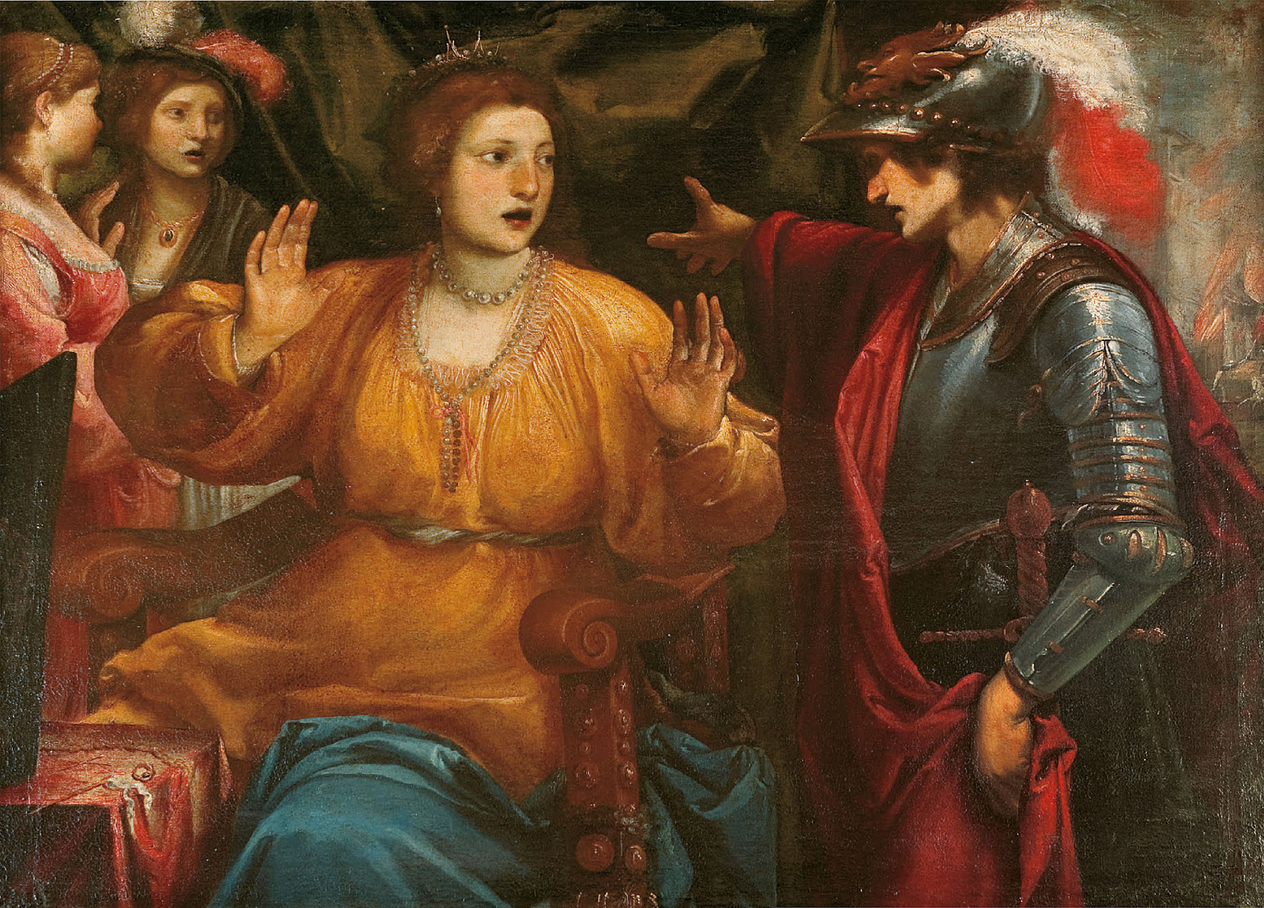
The Queen Semiramis (1630) by the Italian Baroque painter Cecco Bravo. Semiramis is one of the fourteen women whose lives are covered in the Tractatus de mulieribus claris in bello, which may have been written by Pamphile.

Classical scholar Deborah Levine Gera has made a case that Pamphile of Epidaurus may be the author of the anonymous surviving treatise Tractatus de mulieribus claris in bello (Treatise on Women Famous in War), written in Greek, which gives accounts of the lives of fourteen famous women. Since Pamphile was a woman herself, Gera states that it is logical that she would take an interest in the stories of famous women of the past. Furthermore, the lives of the various women in the Tractatus de mulieribus are arranged in a seemingly random order, which is consistent with a statement from Photios that Pamphile organized her writings in the forms of miscellaneous collections rather than in a strict and orderly manner. Photios also states that Pamphile's style was very plain, which is consistent with the writing style of the Tractatus de mulieribus.

Additionally, Pamphile is known to have written a three-volume epitome of the Persica by the fifth-century BC historian Ctesias, which also happens to be the source for two of the fourteen lives in the Tractatus de mulieribus. According to Gera, the "Life of Semiramis" from the Tractatus de mulieribus in particular is "a succinct and accurate summary of nearly two books of the Persica." It is possible Pamphile's name may have been removed from the treatise at some point, since it is known that many of her works later became attributed to her husband. Nonetheless, Gera states that Pamphile is only one of several possible authors for the treatise.

== See also ==
- Ban Zhao, a contemporary female historian in ancient China during its Eastern Han dynasty
