= Alyattes =

King of Lydia (c. 635 – c. 585 BC)

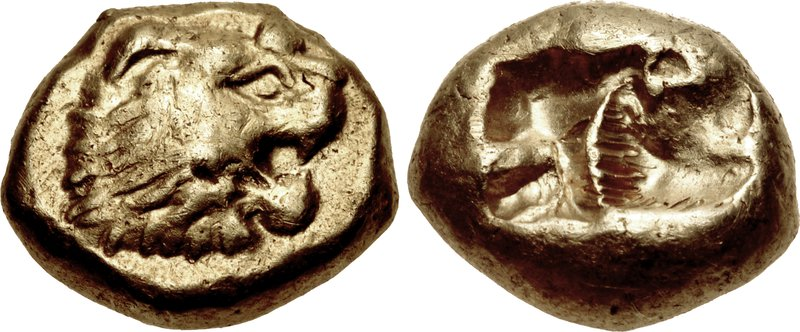
- Coin of Alyattes, c. 620/10 – 564/53 BC.

King of Lydia
- Reign: c. 635 – c. 585 BC
- Predecessor: Sadyattes
- Successor: Croesus
- Died: 585 BC; Sardis
- Burial: 585 BC; Plain of Sardis (now Bin Tepe)
- Issue: Aryenis; Croesus; Pantaleon
- Lydian: 𐤥𐤠𐤩𐤥𐤤𐤯𐤤𐤮 (Walweteś)
- Dynasty: Mermnad dynasty
- Father: Sadyattes
- Mother: Lyde

Alyattes (Lydian language: 𐤥𐤠𐤩𐤥𐤤𐤯𐤤𐤮 Walweteś; Ancient Greek: Ἀλυάττης Aluáttēs; reigned c. 635 – c. 585 BC), sometimes described as Alyattes I, was the fourth king of the Mermnad dynasty in Lydia, the son of Sadyattes, grandson of Ardys, and great-grandson of Gyges. He died after a reign of 57 years and was succeeded by his son Croesus.

Alyattes was the first monarch who issued coins, made from electrum (and his successor Croesus was the first to issue gold coins). Alyattes is therefore sometimes mentioned as the originator of coinage, or of currency.

== Name ==
The most likely etymology for the name Aluáttēs derives it, via a form with initial digamma Ϝαλυάττης (Waluáttēs), itself originally from a Lydian Walweteś (Lydian alphabet: 𐤥𐤠𐤩𐤥𐤤𐤯𐤤𐤮). The name Walweteś meant "lion-ness" (i.e. the state of being a lion), and was composed of the Lydian term walwe (𐤥𐤠𐤩𐤥𐤤), meaning "lion", to which was added an abstract suffix -at(t)a- (𐤠𐤯𐤠-).

== Chronology ==
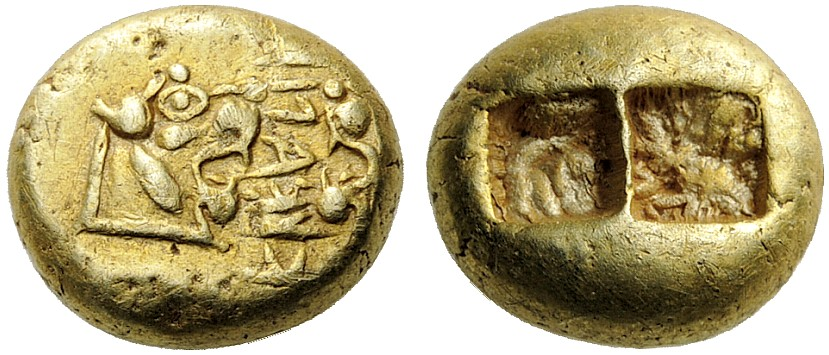
Electrum trite, Alyattes, Lydia, 610–560 BC. (inscribed KUKALI[M])

Dates for the Mermnad kings are uncertain and are based on a computation by J. B. Bury and Russell Meiggs (1975) who estimated c.687–c.652 BC for the reign of Gyges. Herodotus 1.16, 1.25, 1.86 gave reign lengths for Gyges's successors, but there is uncertainty about these as the total exceeds the timespan between 652 (probable death of Gyges, fighting the Cimmerians) and 547/546 (fall of Sardis to Cyrus the Great). Bury and Meiggs concluded that Ardys and Sadyattes reigned through an unspecified period in the second half of the 7th century BC, but they did not propose dates for Alyattes except their assertion that his son Croesus succeeded him in 560 BC. The timespan 560–546 BC for the reign of Croesus is almost certainly accurate.

However, based on an analysis of sources contemporary with Gyges, such as Neo-Assyrian records, Anthony Spalinger has convincingly deduced dated Gyges's death to 644 BCE, and Alexander Dale has consequently dated Alyattes's reign as starting in c. 635 BCE and ending in 585 BCE.

== Early life ==
Alyattes was the son of the king Sadyattes of Lydia and his sister and queen, Lyde of Lydia, both the children of the king Ardys of Lydia. Alyattes ascended to the kingship of Lydia during a period of severe crisis: during the 7th century BCE, the Cimmerians, a nomadic people from the Eurasian Steppe who had invaded Western Asia, attacked Lydia several times but had been repelled by Alyattes's great-grandfather, Gyges. In 644 BCE, the Cimmerians, led by their king Lygdamis, attacked Lydia for the third time. The Lydians were defeated, Sardis was sacked, and Gyges was killed, following which he was succeeded by his son Ardys. In 637 BCE, during the seventh regnal year of Ardys, the Thracian Treres tribe who had migrated across the Thracian Bosporus and invaded Anatolia, under their king Kobos, and in alliance with the Cimmerians and the Lycians, attacked Lydia. They defeated the Lydians again and for a second time sacked the Lydian capital of Sardis, except for its citadel. It is probable that Ardys was killed during this Cimmerian attack or was deposed in 637 BC for being unable to protect Lydia from the Cimmerian attacks, and Ardys's son and successor Sadyattes might have also been either killed during another Cimmerian attack in 653 BCE or deposed that year for his inability to successfully protect Lydia from the Cimmerian incursions.

== Reign ==
Alyattes succeeded his father Sadyattes amidst extreme turmoil in 635 BCE.

=== Initial relations with the Ionians ===
Alyattes started his reign by continuing the hostilities with the Ionian city of Miletus started by Sadyattes. Alyattes's war with Miletus consisted largely of a series of raids to capture the Milesians' harvest of grain, which were severely lacking in the Lydian core regions. These hostilities lasted until Alyattes's sixth year (c. 630 BCE), when he finally made peace with the city's tyrant Thrasybulus, and a treaty of friendship as well as one of military alliance was concluded between Lydia and Miletus whereby, since Miletus lacked auriferous and other metallurgic resources while cereals were scarce in Lydia, trade of Lydian metal in exchange of Milesian cereal was initiated to seal these treaties, according to which Miletus voluntarily provided Lydia with military auxiliaries and would profit from the Lydian control of the routes in inner Anatolia, and Lydia would gain access to the markets and maritime networks of the Milesians in the Black Sea and at Naucratis. Herodotus's account of Alyattes's illness, caused by Lydian troops' destruction of the temple Athena in Assesos, and which was cured after he heeded the Pythia and rebuilt two temples of Athena in Assesos and then made peace with Miletus, is a largely legendary account of these events which appears to not be factual. This legendary account likely arose as a result of Alyattes's offerings to the sanctuary of Delphi.

Unlike with the other Greek cities of Anatolia, Alyattes always maintained very good relations with Ephesus, to whose ruling dynasty the Mermnads were connected by marriage: Alyattes's great-grandfather had married one of his daughters to the Ephesian tyrant Melas the Elder: Alyattes's grandfather Ardys had married his daughter Lyde to a grandson of Melas the Elder named Miletus (Lyde would later marry her own brother Sadyattes, and Alyattes would be born from this marriage); and Alyattes himself married one of his own daughters to the then tyrant of Miletus, a descendant of Miletus named Melas the Younger, and from this union would be born Pindar of Ephesus. One of the daughters of Melas the Younger might have in turn married Alyattes and become the mother of his less famous son, Pantaleon. Thanks to these close ties, Ephesus had never been subject to Lydian attacks and was exempt from paying tribute and offering military support to Lydia, and both the Greeks of Ephesus and the Anatolian peoples of the region, that is the Lydians and Carians, shared in common the temple of an Anatolian goddess equated by the Greeks to their own goddess Artemis. Lydia and Ephesus also shared important economic interests which allowed Ephesus to hold an advantageous position between the maritime trade routes of the Aegean Sea and the continental trade routes going through inner Anatolia and reaching Assyria, thus acting as an intermediary between the Lydian kingdom which controlled access to the trade routes leading to the inside of Asia and the Greeks inhabiting the European continent and the Aegean islands, and allowing Ephesus to profit from the goods transiting across its territory without fear of any military attack by the Lydians. These connections in turn provided Lydia with a port through which it could have access to the Mediterranean Sea.

=== Offerings to Delphi ===
Like his great-grandfather Gyges, Alyattes also dedicated lavish offerings to the oracle of the god Apollo at Delphi. According to the Greek historian Herodotus, Alyattes's offerings consisted of a large silver crater and an iron crater-stand which had been made by welding by Glaucus of Chios, thus combining Lydian and Ionian artistic traditions.

Alyattes's offering to Delphi might have been sent to please the sanctuary of Apollo and the Delphains, especially the priests, to impress the Greek visitors of the sanctuary, and to influence the oracle to advise to Periander of Corinth, an ally of Thrasybulus of Miletus, to convince the latter to make peace with Alyattes.

=== Lyde of Lydia story ===
According to Tractatus de mulieribus (citing Xenophilos of Sardeis, who wrote the history of Lydia), Lyde was the wife and sister of Sadyattes, the ancestor of Croesus. Lyde's son, Alyattes, when he inherited the kingdom from his father, committed the terrible crime of tearing the clothes of respectable people and spitting on many. She too held her son back as much as she could and placated those who were insulted with kind words and actions. She showed all his compassion to her son and made him feel great love for himself. When she believes that he is loved enough and abstains from food and other things, citing his illness as an excuse, Xenophilos accompanies his mother that he does not eat in the same way and has changed enough to be extremely honest and fair (someone). Alyattes after seeing this becomes a changed man.

=== Relations with Caria ===
In the south, Alyattes continued what had been the Lydian policy since Gyges's reign of maintaining alliances with the city-states of the Carians, with whom the Lydians also had strong cultural connections, such as sharing the sanctuary of the god Zeus of Mylasa with the Carians and the Mysians because they believed these three peoples descended from three brothers. These alliances between the Lydian kings and the various Carian dynasts required the Lydian and Carian rulers had to support each other, and to solidify these alliances, Alyattes married a woman from the Carian aristocracy with whom he had a son, Croesus, who would eventually succeed him. These connections established between the Lydian kings and the Carian city-states ensured that the Lydians were able to control Caria through alliances with Carian dynasts ruling over fortified settlements, such as Mylasa and Pedasa, and through Lydian aristocrats settled in Carian cities, such as in Aphrodisias.

=== Wars against the Cimmerians ===
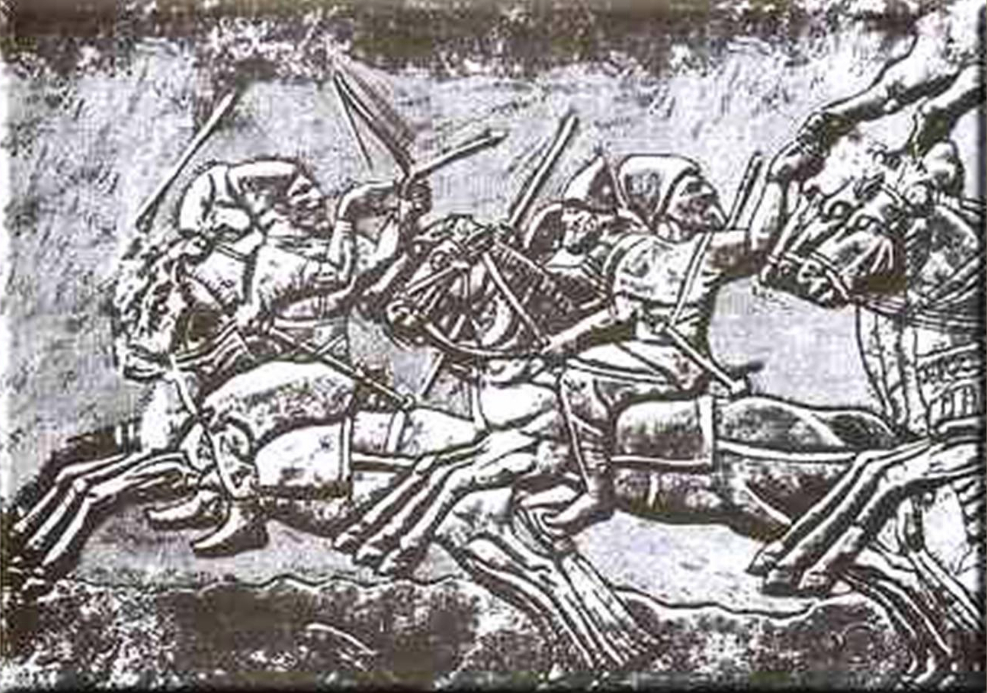
An Assyrian relief depicting Cimmerian mounted warriors

Alyattes had inherited more than one war from his father, and soon after his ascension and early during his reign, with Assyrian approval and in alliance with the Lydians, the Scythians under their king Madyes entered Anatolia, expelled the Treres from Asia Minor, and defeated the Cimmerians so that they no longer constituted a threat again, following which the Scythians extended their domination to Central Anatolia until they were themselves expelled by the Medes from Western Asia in the 600s BCE. This final defeat of the Cimmerians was carried out by the joint forces of Madyes, whom Strabo credits with expelling the Treres and Cimmerians from Asia Minor, and of Alyattes, whom Herodotus of Halicarnassus and Polyaenus claim finally defeated the Cimmerians.

In Polyaenus' account of the defeat of the Cimmerians, he claimed that Alyattes used "war dogs" to expel them from Asia Minor, with the term "war dogs" being a Greek folkloric reinterpretation of young Scythian warriors who, following the Indo-European passage rite of the [[Kóryos|*kóryos]], would ritually take on the role of wolf- or dog-warriors.

Immediately after this first victory of his over the Cimmerians, Alyattes expelled from the Lydian borderlands a final remaining pocket of Cimmerian presence who had been occupying the nearby city of Antandrus for one century, and to facilitate this he re-founded the city of Adramyttium in Aeolis. Alyattes installed his son Croesus as the governor of Adramyttium, and he soon expelled these last remaining Cimmerians from Asia Minor. Adramyttium was moreso an important site for Lydia because it was situated near Atarneus and Astyra, where rich mines were located.

=== Eastern conquests ===
Alyattes turned towards Phrygia in the east. The kings of Lydia and of the former Phrygian kingdom had already entertained friendly relations before the destruction of the latter by the Cimmerians. After defeating the Cimmerians, Alyattes took advantage of the weakening of the various polities all across Anatolia by the Cimmerian raids and used the lack of a centralised Phrygian state and the traditionally friendly relations between the Lydian and Phrygian elites to extend Lydian rule eastwards to Phrygia. Lydian presence in Phrygia is archaeologically attested by the existence of a Lydian citadel in the Phrygian capital of Gordion, as well as Lydian architectural remains in northwest Phrygia, such as in Dascylium, and in the Phrygian Highlands at Midas City. Lydian troops might have been stationed in the aforementioned locations as well as in Hacıtuğrul, Afyonkarahisar, and Konya, which would have provided to the Lydian kingdom access to the produce and roads of Phrygia. The presence of a Lydian ivory plaque at Kerkenes Daǧ suggests that Alyattes's control of Phrygia might have extended to the east of the Halys River to include the city of Pteria, with the possibility that he may have rebuilt this city and placed a Phrygian ruler there: Pteria's strategic location would have been useful in protecting the Lydian Empire from attacks from the east, and its proximity to the Royal Road would have made of the city an important centre from which caravans could be protected. Phrygia under Lydian rule would continue to be administered by its local elites, such as the ruler of Midas City who held Phrygian royal titles such as lavagtaei 'army commander' and vanaktei 'king', but were under the authority of the Lydian kings of Sardis and had a Lydian diplomatic presence at their court, following the framework of the traditional vassalage treaties used since the period of the Hittite and Assyrian empires, and according to which the Lydian king imposed on the vassal rulers a "treaty of vassalage" which allowed the local Phrygian rulers to remain in power, in exchange of which the Phrygian vassals had the duty to provide military support and sometimes offer rich tribute to the Lydian kingdom. The status of Gordion and Dascylium is however less clear, and it is uncertain whether they were also ruled by local Phrygian kings vassal to the Lydian king, or whether they were directly ruled by Lydian governors.

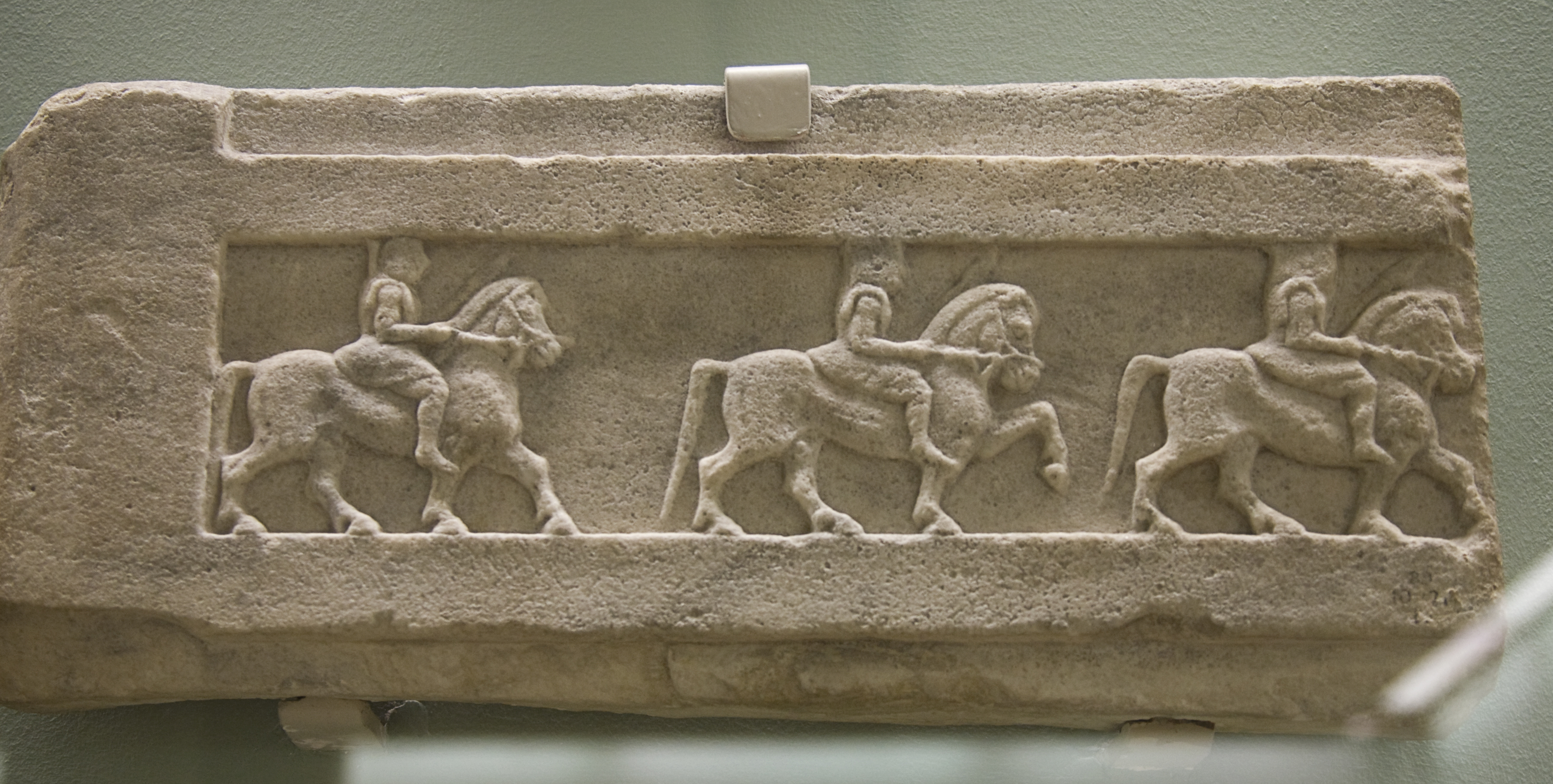
A relief depicting mounted Lydian warriors on slab of marble from a tomb.

With the defeat of the Cimmerians having created a power vacuum in Anatolia, Alyattes continued his expansionist policy in the east, and of all the peoples to the west of the Halys River whom Herodotus claimed Alyattes's successor Croesus ruled over - the Lydians, Phrygians, Mysians, Mariandyni, Chalybes, Paphlagonians, Thyni and Bithyni Thracians, Carians, Ionians, Dorians, Aeolians, and Pamphylians - it is very likely that a number of these populations had already been conquered under Alyattes, especially since information is attested only about the relations between the Lydians and the Phrygians in both literary and archaeological sources, and there is no available data concerning relations between the other mentioned peoples and the Lydian kings. The only populations Herodotus claimed were independent of the Lydian Empire were the Lycians, who lived in a mountainous country which would not have been accessible to the Lydian armies, and the Cilicians, who had already been conquered by Neo-Babylonian Empire. Modern estimates nevertheless suggest that it is not impossible that the Lydians might have subjected Lycia, given that the Lycian coast would have been important for the Lydians because it was close to a trade route connecting the Aegean region, the Levant, and Cyprus.

At some point in the later years of his reign, Alyattes conducted a military campaign in Caria, although the reason for this intervention is yet unknown. Alyattes's son Croesus, as governor of Adramyttium, had to provide his father with Ionian Greek mercenaries for this war.

=== Later wars against the Ionians ===
In 600 BCE, Alyattes resumed his military activities in the west, and the second Ionian city he attacked was Smyrna despite the Lydian kings having previously established good relations with the Smyrniotes in the aftermath of a failed attack of Gyges on the city, leading to the Lydians using the port of Smyrna to export their products and import grain, Lydian craftsmen being allowed to settle in Smyrniot workshops, and Alyattes having provided funding to the inhabitants of the city for the construction of their temple of Athena. Alyattes was thus able to acquire a port which gave the Lydian kingdom permanent access to the sea and a stable source of grain to feed the population of his kingdom through this attack. Smyrna was placed under the direct rule of a member of the Mermnad dynasty, and Alyattes had new fortification walls built for Smyrna from around 600 to around 590 BCE. Although under direct Lydian rule Smyrna's temple of Athena and its houses were rebuilt and the city was not forced to provide the Lydian kingdom with military troops or tribute, Smyrna itself was in ruins, and it would only be around 580 BCE, under the reign of Alyattes's son Croesus, that Smyrna would finally start to recover.

Alyattes also initially initiated friendly relations with the Ionian city of Colophon, which included a military alliance according to which the city had to offer the service of its famous and feared cavalry, which was itself made up of the aristocracy of Colophon, to the Lydian kingdom should Alyattes request their help. Following the capture of Smyrna, Alyattes attacked the Ionian city of Clazomenae, but the inhabitants of the city managed to successfully repel him with the help of the Colophonian cavalry. Following Alyattes's defeat, the Lydian kingdom and the city of Clazomenae concluded a reconciliation agreement which allowed Lydian craftsmen to operate in Clazomenae and allowed the kingdom of Lydia itself to participate in maritime trade, most especially in the olive oil trade produced by the craftsmen of Clazomenae, but also to use the city's port to export products manufactured in Lydia proper. Soon after capturing Smyrna and his failure to capture Clazomenae, Alyattes summoned the Colophonian cavalry to Sardis, where he had them massacred in violation of hospitality laws and redistributed their horses to Lydian cavalrymen, following which he placed Colophon itself under direct Lydian rule. The reason for Alyattes's breaking of the friendly relations with Colophon are unknown, although the archaeologist John Manuel Cook has suggested that Alyattes might have concluded a treaty of friendship and a military alliance with Colophon to secure the city's non-interference in his military operations against the other Greek cities on the western coast of Asia Minor, but Colophon first violated these agreements with Alyattes by supporting Clazomenae with its cavalry against Alyattes's attack, prompting the Lydian king to retaliate by massacring the mounted aristocracy of Colophon.

The status of the other Ionian Greek cities on the western coast of Asia Minor, that is Teos, Lebedus, Teichiussa, Melie, Erythrae, Phocaea and Myus, is still uncertain for the period of Alyattes's reign, although they would all eventually be subjected by his son Croesus.

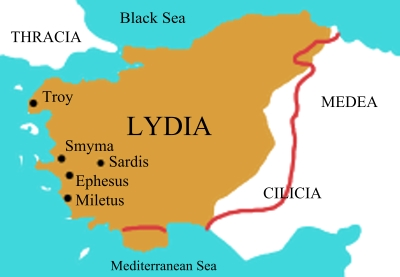
Lydia's borders under the reign of Alyattes's son Croesus

=== War against the Medes ===
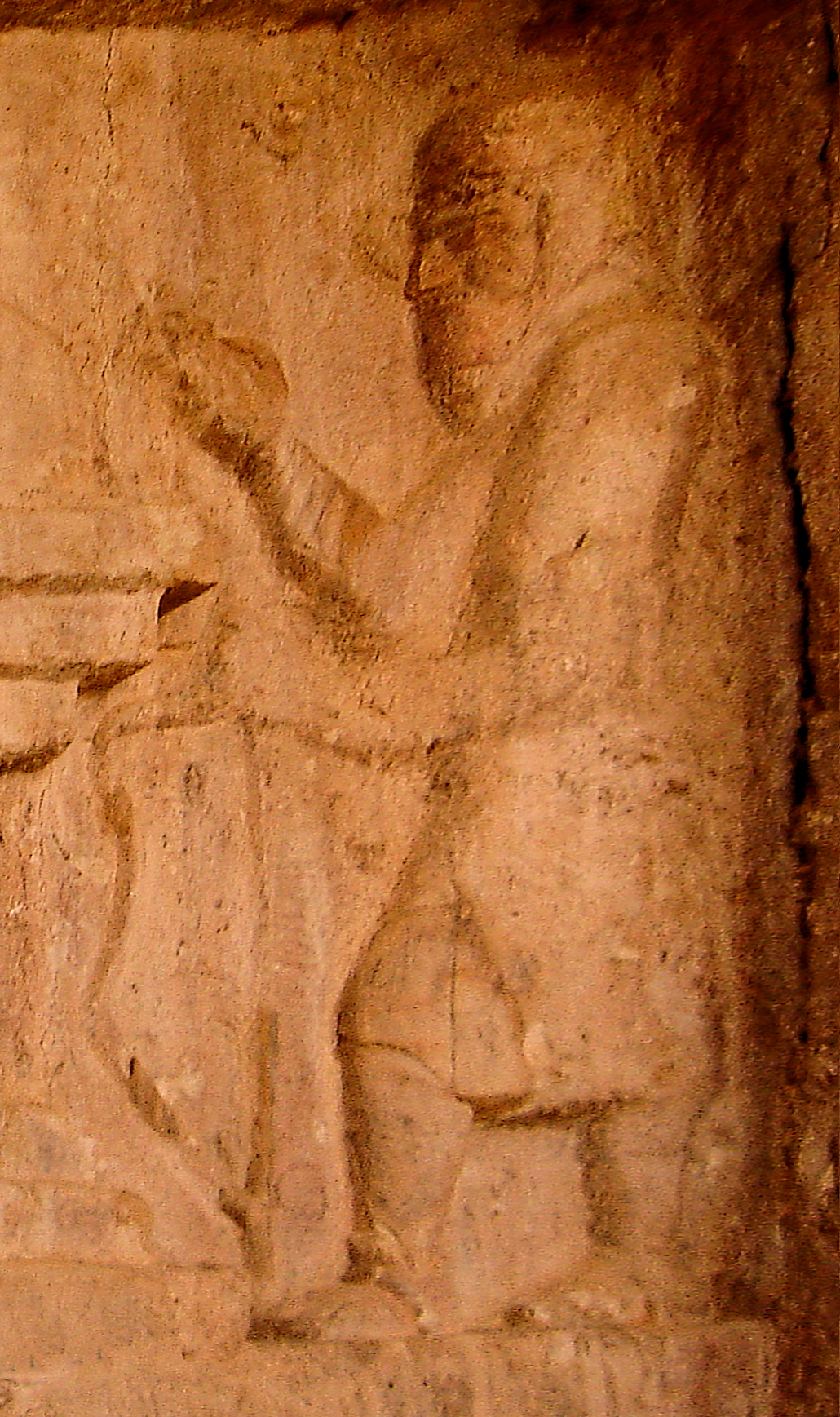
The Median king Cyaxares.

Alyattes's eastern conquests extended the Lydian Empire till the Upper Euphrates according to the scholar Igor Diakonoff, who identified Alyattes with the Biblical Gog. This expansionism brought the Lydian Empire in conflict in the 590s BCE with the Medes, an Iranian people who had expelled the majority of the Scythians from Western Asia after participating in the destruction of the Neo-Assyrian Empire. After the majority of the Scythians were expelled by the Medes during that decade out of Western Asia and into the Pontic Steppe, a war broke out between the Median Empire and another group of Scythians, probably members of a splinter group who had formed a kingdom in what is now Azerbaijan. These Scythians left Median-ruled Transcaucasia and fled to Sardis, because the Lydians had been allied to the Scythians. After Alyattes refused to accede to the demands of the Median king Cyaxares that these Scythian refugees be handed to him, a war broke out between the Median and Lydian Kingdoms in 590 BCE which was waged in eastern Anatolia beyond Pteria. This war lasted five years, until a solar eclipse occurred in 585 BCE during a battle (hence called the Battle of the Eclipse) opposing the Lydian and Median armies, which both sides interpreted as an omen to end the war. The Babylonian king Nebuchadnezzar II and the king Syennesis of Cilicia acted as mediators in the ensuing peace treaty, which was sealed by the marriage of Cyaxares's son Astyages with Alyattes's daughter Aryenis, and the possible wedding of a daughter of Cyaxares with either Alyattes or with his son Croesus. The border between the Lydian and Median empires was fixed at a yet undetermined location in eastern Anatolia; the Graeco-Roman historians' traditional account of the Halys River as having been set as the border between the two kingdoms appears to have been a retroactive narrative construction based on symbolic role assigned by Greeks to the Halys as the separation between Lower Asia and Upper Asia as well as on the Halys being a later provincial border within the Achaemenid Empire.

=== Death ===
Alyattes died shortly after the Battle of the Eclipse, in 585 BCE itself, following which Lydia faced a power struggle between his son Pantaleon, born from a Greek woman, and his other son Croesus, born from a Carian noblewoman, out of which the latter emerged successful. The tomb of Alyattes is located in Sardis at the site now called Bin Tepe, in a large tumulus measuring sixty metres in height and of a diameter of two hundred and fifty metres. The tomb consisted of an antechamber and a chamber with a door separating them, was built of well fitted and clamped large marble blocks, its walls were finely finished on the inside, and it contained a now lost crepidoma. The tomb of Alyattes was excavated by the Prussian Consul General Ludwig Peter Spiegelthal in 1853, and by American excavators in 1962 and the 1980s, although by then it had been broken in and looted by tomb robbers who left only alabastra and ceramic vessels. Before it was plundered, the tomb of Alyattes would likely have contained burial gifts consisting of furniture made of wood and ivory, textiles, jewellery, and large sets of solver and gold bowls, pitchers, craters, and ladles.

He created the first coins in history made from electrum, a naturally occurring alloy of gold and silver. The weight of either precious metal could not just be weighed so they contained an imprint that identified the issuer who guaranteed the value of its contents. Today we still use a token currency, where the value is guaranteed by the state and not by the value of the metal used in the coins. Almost all coins used today descended from his invention after the technology passed into Greek usage through Hermodike II - a Greek princess from Cyme who was likely one of his wives (assuming he was referred to a dynastic 'Midas' because of the wealth his coinage amassed and because the electrum was sourced from Midas' famed river Pactolus); she was also likely the mother of Croesus (see croeseid symbolism). He standardised the weight of coins (1 stater = 168 grains of wheat). The coins were produced using an anvil die technique and stamped with a lion's head, the symbol of the Mermnadae.

== Tomb ==
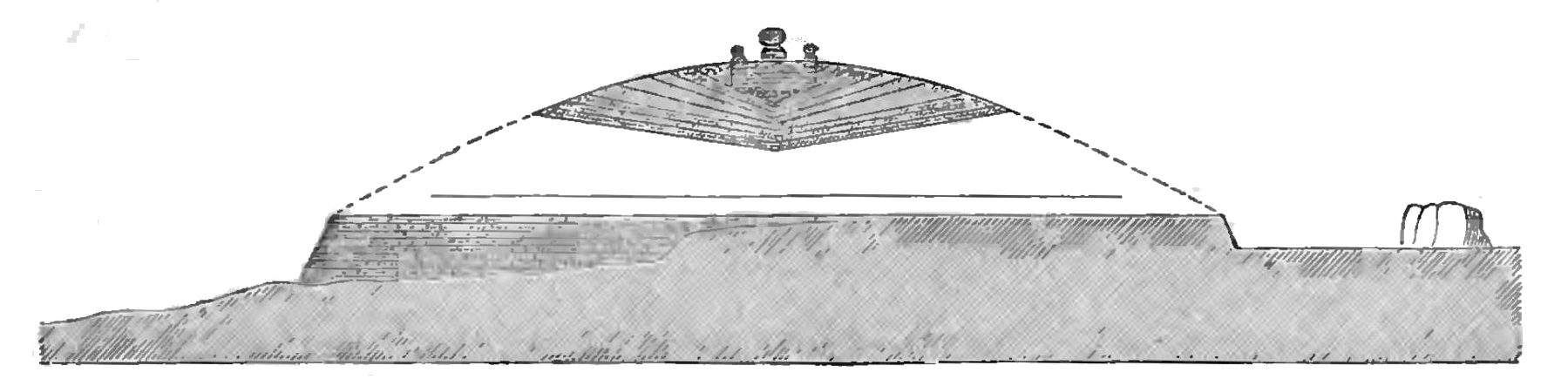
Section of the tomb of Alyattes. It is "one of the largest tumuli ever built", with a diameter of 360 meters and a height of 61 meters.

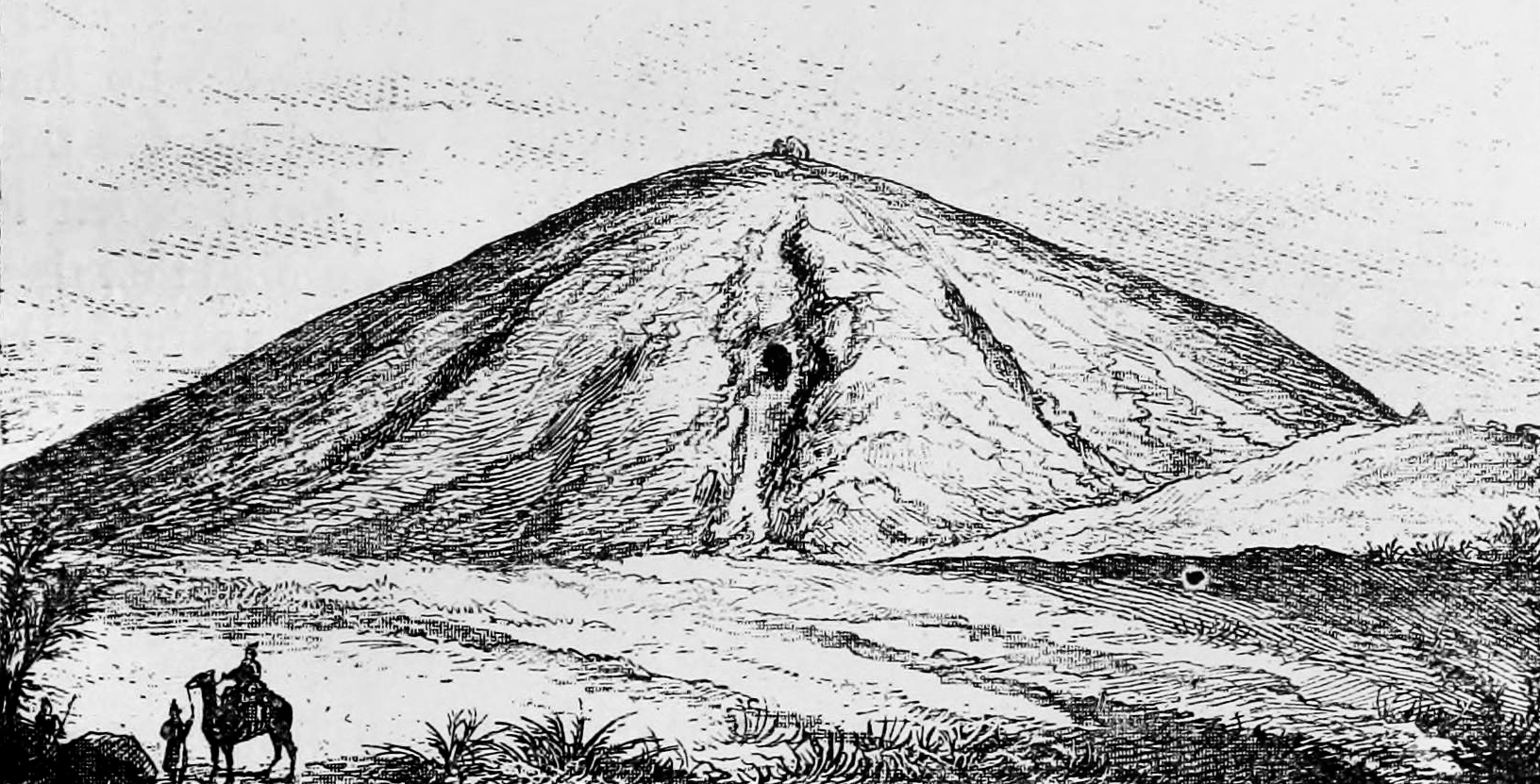
Tomb of Alyattes, 19th century.

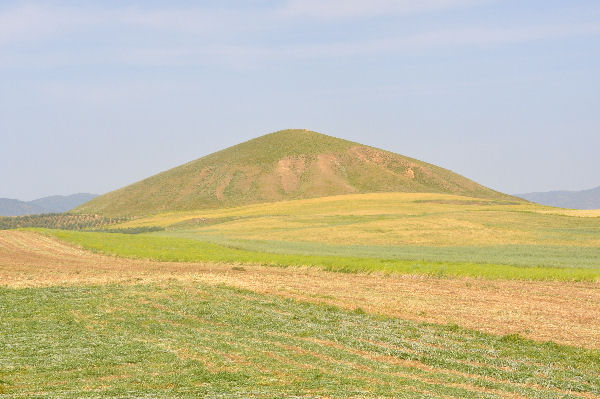
Tomb of Alyattes today.

Alyattes' tomb still exists on the plateau between Lake Gygaea and the river Hermus to the north of the Lydian capital Sardis — a large mound of earth with a substructure of huge stones. (38.5723401N, 28.0451151E) It was excavated by Spiegelthal in 1854, who found that it covered a large vault of finely cut marble blocks approached by a flat-roofed passage of the same stone from the south. The sarcophagus and its contents had been removed by early plunderers of the tomb. All that was left were some broken alabaster vases, pottery and charcoal. On the summit of the mound were large phalli of stone.

Herodotus described the tomb:

But there is one building to be seen there which is more notable than any, saving those of Egypt and Babylon. There is in Lydia the tomb of Alyattes the father of Croesus, the base whereof is made of great stones and the rest of it of mounded earth. It was built by the men of the market and the artificers and the prostitutes. There remained till my time five corner-stones set on the top of the tomb, and on these was graven the record of the work done by each kind: and measurement showed that the prostitutes' share of the work was the greatest.

— Herodotus 1-93.

Some authors have suggested that Buddhist stupas were derived from a wider cultural tradition from the Mediterranean to the Indus valley, and can be related to the funeral conical mounds on circular bases that can be found in Lydia or in Phoenicia from the 8th century B.C., such as the tomb of Alyattes.

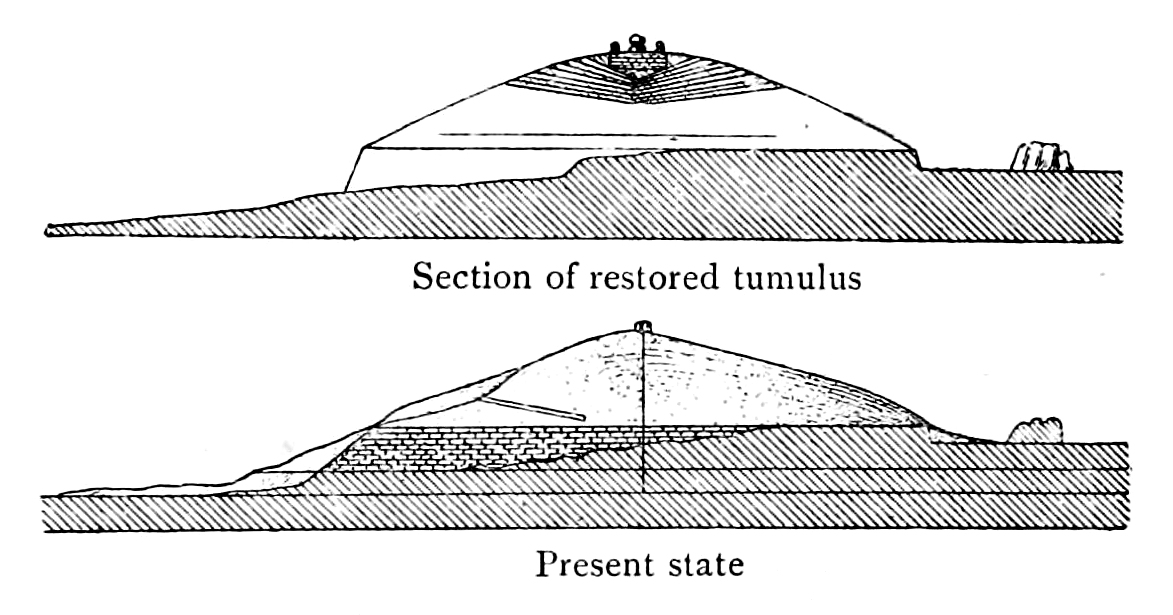
Alyattes tumulus reconstitution

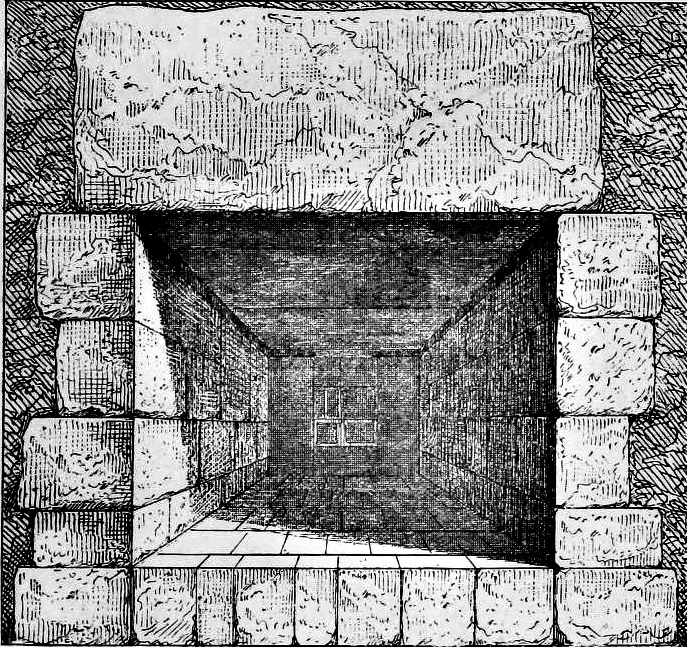
Alyattes tomb entrance

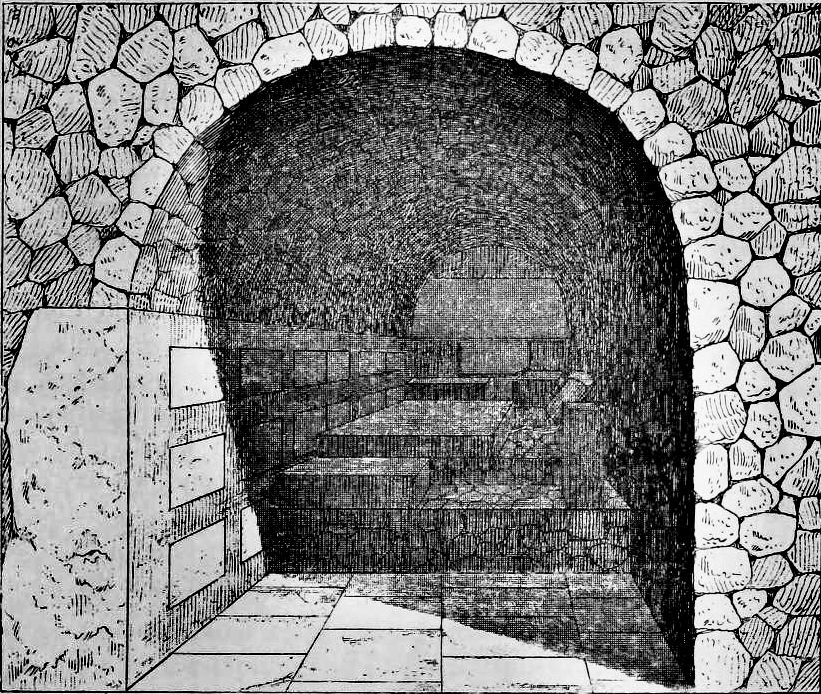
Alyattes tomb passageway

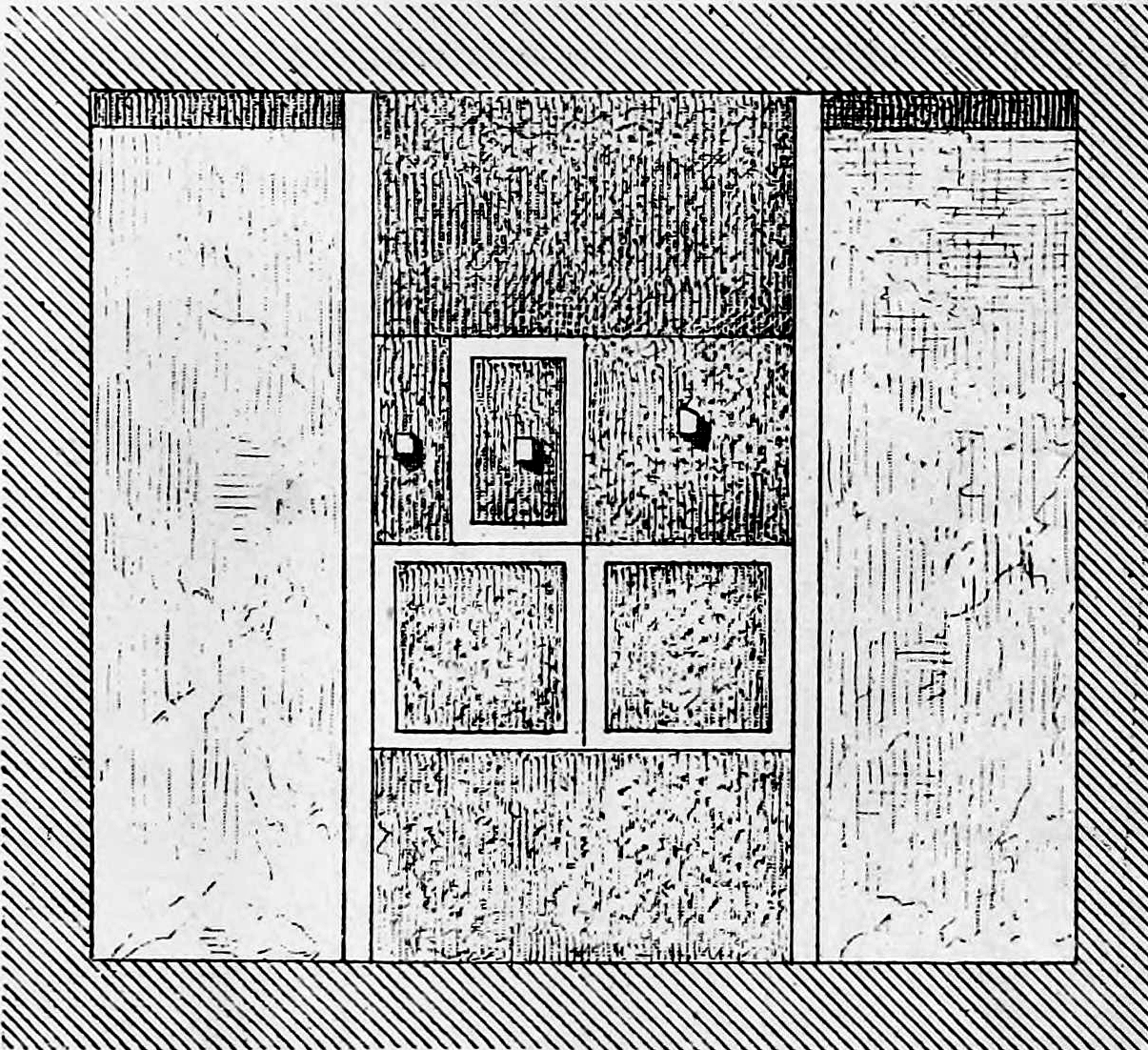
Alyattes tomb inner vault

== Sources ==
- Bury, J. B.; Meiggs, Russell (1975) [first published 1900]. A History of Greece (Fourth ed.). London: MacMillan Press. ISBN 0-333-15492-4.
- Diakonoff, I. M. (1985). "Media". In Gershevitch, Ilya (ed.). The Cambridge History of Iran. Vol. 2. Cambridge: Cambridge University Press. pp. 94–95. ISBN 978-0-521-20091-2.
- Grousset, René (1970). The Empire of the Steppes. Rutgers University Press. ISBN 0-8135-1304-9.
- Herodotus (1975) [first published 1954]. Burn, A. R.; de Sélincourt, Aubrey (eds.). The Histories. London: Penguin Books. ISBN 0-14-051260-8.
- Cook, J. M. (1988). "The Eastern Greeks". In Boardman, John; Hammond, N. G. L. (eds.). The Cambridge Ancient History. Vol. 3. Cambridge: Cambridge University Press. pp. 196–221. ISBN 978-0-521-23447-4.* Ivantchik, Askold (1993a). Les Cimmériens au Proche-Orient [The Cimmerians in the Near East] (PDF) (in French). Fribourg, Switzerland; Göttingen, Germany: Editions Universitaires (Switzerland); Vandenhoeck & Ruprecht (Germany). ISBN 978-3-727-80876-0.
- Ivantchik, Askold (1993b). "LES GUERRIERS-CHIENS: Loups-garous et invasions scythes en Asie Mineure" [THE DOG WARRIORS: Werewolves and Scythian invasions in Asia Minor]. Revue de l'histoire des religions [Review of the History of Religions]. 210 (3): 305–330. doi:10.3406/rhr.1993.1478. JSTOR 23671794.
- Ivantchik, Askold (2006). Aruz, Joan; Farkas, Ann; Fino, Elisabetta Valtz (eds.). The Golden Deer of Eurasia: Perspectives on the Steppe Nomads of the Ancient World. New Haven, Connecticut, United States; New York City, United States; London, United Kingdom: The Metropolitan Museum of Art; Yale University Press. pp. 146–153. ISBN 978-1-588-39205-3.
- Mellink, M. (1991). "The Native Kingdoms of Anatolia". In Boardman, John; Edwards, I. E. S.; Hammond, N. G. L.; Sollberger, E.; Walker, C. B. F. (eds.). The Cambridge Ancient History. Vol. 3. Cambridge: Cambridge University Press. pp. 619–665. ISBN 978-1-139-05429-4.
- Sulimirski, Tadeusz; Taylor, T. F. (1991). "The Scythians". In Boardman, John; Edwards, I. E. S.; Hammond, N. G. L.; Sollberger, E.; Walker, C. B. F. (eds.). The Cambridge Ancient History. Vol. 3. Cambridge: Cambridge University Press. pp. 547–590. ISBN 978-1-139-05429-4.

Attribution:

- This article incorporates text from a publication now in the public domain: Chisholm, Hugh, ed. (1911). "Alyattes". Encyclopædia Britannica. Vol. 1 (11th ed.). Cambridge University Press. p. 776. This cites A. von Ölfers, "Über die lydischen Königsgräber bei Sardes," Abh. Berl. Ak., 1858.

Walweteś Mermnad dynasty Died: 585 BCE
Regnal titles
Preceded by Sadyattes	King of Lydia c. 635–585 BCE	Succeeded by Croesus
