= Teichiussa =

Ancient Greek town

Coordinates: 37°21′11″N 27°27′29″E

Teichiussa or Teichioussa (Ancient Greek: Τειχιοῦσσα and Τειχιόεσσα) was a town of ancient Caria or of Ionia in the territory of Miletus, and according to Thucydides, Athenaeus and Stephanus of Byzantium, a possession of the latter city. Archestratus called it a village of Miletus. It was a polis (city-state) and a member of the Delian League. During the Peloponnesian War, the Spartans struck at Iasos from here.

Its site is located near Kazıklı, Asiatic Turkey.
