= Tractatus de mulieribus =

Ancient Greek work discussing famous women in antiquity

Tractatus de mulieribus claris in bello ("Treatise on Women Distinguished in Wars"; Greek: Γυναῖκες ἐν πολεμικοῖς συνεταὶ καὶ ἀνδρεῖαι, "Women wise and brave in the art of war") is a short ancient Greek work by an anonymous author, which discusses fourteen famous ancient women, of whom one is not otherwise attested. The treatise is preserved as part of a 12th- or 13th-Century manuscript in the Laurentian Library in Florence, Codex Laurentianus 56-1.

Despite the title, not all of the women discussed are warriors, and only a few are portrayed as skilled military strategists. It was written near the end of the second or the beginning of the first century BCE. Deborah Gera has suggested, however, that it was written by Pamphile of Epidaurus during the 1st century AD.

It is a list of ancient women, four Greek and ten barbarian, and contains the following individuals:

- Semiramis
- Zarinaea
- Nitocris the Egyptian
- Nitocris the Babylonian
- Argeia
- Dido
- Atossa
- Rhodogune of Parthia
- Lyde (Woman who tames her son Alyattes by fasting)
- Pheretime
- Thargelia
- Tomyris
- Artemisia I of Caria
- Onomaris

== Text ==
Text of Tractatus de Mulieribus at archive.org
