= Ardys of Lydia =

Second king of the Mermnad dynasty in Lydia

King of Lydia
- Reign: 644-637 BC
- Predecessor: Gyges
- Successor: Sadyattes
- Died: 637 BC (?)
- Issue: Sadyattes; Lyde
- Dynasty: Mermnad dynasty
- Father: Gyges

Ardys (Ancient Greek: Αρδυς, romanized: Ardus, also Αρδυσος Ardusos; Latin: Ardys, Ardysus; reigned 644–637 BC) was the son of Gyges of Lydia, whom he succeeded as the second king of the Mermnad dynasty.

== Name ==
The name Ardys is the Latin form of Ardus (Αρδυς), which is itself the Hellenised form of a Lydian language name which was a cognate of either the Hittite bird-name ardus or of the Hittite word for descendant, ḫardu- (𒄩𒅈𒁺).

== Life ==
=== Background ===
During the 7th century BC, the Cimmerians, a nomadic people from the Eurasian Steppe who had invaded Western Asia, attacked Lydia several times but had been repelled by Ardys's father, Gyges. In 644 BC, the Cimmerians attacked Lydia for the third time, led by their king Lygdamis. The Lydians were defeated, Sardis was sacked, and Ardys's father Gyges was killed, following which Ardys became the king of Lydia.

=== Reign ===
On assuming kingship, Ardys resumed the diplomatic activity with the Neo-Assyrian Empire which Gyges had ended. Ardys attacked the Ionian Greek city of Miletus and succeeded in capturing the city of Priene, after which Priene would remain under direct rule of the Lydian kingdom until its end.

Ardys's reign was short-lived, likely due to the period of severe crisis Lydia was facing because of the Cimmerian invasions. In 637 BC, that is in Ardys's seventh regnal year, the Thracian Treres tribe who had migrated across the Thracian Bosporus and invaded Anatolia, under their king Kobos, and in alliance with the Cimmerians and the Lycians, attacked Lydia. They defeated the Lydians again and for a second time sacked the Lydian capital of Sardis, except for its citadel. It is probable that Ardys was killed during this Cimmerian attack, or that he was deposed because he was unable to successfully defend Lydia from the Cimmerian invasions.

== Aftermath ==
Ardys's son and successor Sadyattes might have also been killed during another Cimmerian attack in 635 BC or deposed that year for being unable to protect Lydia from the Cimmerian attacks.

Soon after 635 BC, with Assyrian approval and in alliance with the Lydians, the Scythians under their king Madyes entered Anatolia, expelled the Treres from Asia Minor, and defeated the Cimmerians so that they no longer constituted a threat again, following which the Scythians extended their domination to Central Anatolia until they were themselves expelled by the Medes from Western Asia in the 600s BC. This final defeat of the Cimmerians was carried out by the joint forces of Madyes, whom Strabo credits with expelling the Treres and Cimmerians from Asia Minor, and of Sadyattes’s son and Ardys’s grandson, the king Alyattes of Lydia, whom Herodotus of Halicarnassus and Polyaenus claim finally defeated the Cimmerians.

== See also ==
- List of kings of Lydia

== Sources ==
- Bury, J. B.; Meiggs, Russell (1975) [first published 1900]. A History of Greece (Fourth ed.). London: MacMillan Press. ISBN 0-333-15492-4.
- Diakonoff, I. M. (1985). "Media". In Gershevitch, Ilya (ed.). The Cambridge History of Iran. Vol. 2. Cambridge: Cambridge University Press. pp. 36–148. ISBN 978-0-521-20091-2.
- Herodotus (1975) [first published 1954]. Burn, A. R.; de Sélincourt, Aubrey (eds.). The Histories. London: Penguin Books. ISBN 0-14-051260-8.
- Ivantchik, Askold (1993). Les Cimmériens au Proche-Orient [The Cimmerians in the Near East] (PDF) (in French). Fribourg, Switzerland; Göttingen, Germany: Éditions Universitaires Fribourg (Switzerland); Vandenhoeck & Ruprecht (Germany). ISBN 978-3-727-80876-0.
- Ivantchik, Askold (2006). Aruz, Joan; Farkas, Ann; Fino, Elisabetta Valtz (eds.). The Golden Deer of Eurasia: Perspectives on the Steppe Nomads of the Ancient World. New Haven, United States; New York City, United States; London, United Kingdom: The Metropolitan Museum of Art; Yale University Press. pp. 146–153. ISBN 978-1-588-39205-3.

Mermnad dynasty Died: 637 BC
Regnal titles
Preceded by Gyges	King of Lydia; 644–637 BC	Succeeded by Sadyattes
