= Dugdammî =

King of the Cimmerians
- Reign: 679-640 BCE
- Predecessor: Teušpā
- Successor: Sandakšatru
- Died: 640 BCE
- Issue: Sandakšatru
- Dynasty: Dugdammî's dynasty
- Religion: Scythian religion (?)

Dugdammî or Tugdammî (Neo-Assyrian Akkadian: 𒁹𒌇𒁮𒈨𒄿), also known by the Greeks as Lygdamis and Dygdamis, was a Cimmerian king of the mid-seventh century BC.

== Name ==
Akkadian Dugdammî/Tugdammî (𒁹𒌇𒁮𒈨𒄿) and Ancient Greek Lugdamis (Λυγδαμις) and Dugdamis (Δυγδαμις) are derived from a name in a Cimmerian dialect of the Old Iranian Scythian language.

According to the Scythologist Sergey Tokhtas’ev, the original form of this name was likely *Dugdamiya, formed from the word *dugda, meaning "milk".

The Iranologist Ľubomír Novák has however noted that the attestation of the name in the forms Dugdammê and Tugdammê in Akkadian and the forms Lugdamis and Dugdamis in Greek shows that its first consonant had experienced the change of the sound /d/ to /l/, which is consistent with the phonetic changes attested in the Scythian languages, in which the Iranic sound /d/ had evolved into Proto-Scythian /δ/ (ð) and finally into Scythian /l/.

== Historical background ==
In the 8th and 7th centuries BCE, a significant movement of the nomads of the Eurasian steppe brought the Scythians into Southwest Asia. According to Herodotus, this movement started when the Massagetae or the Issedones migrated westwards, forcing the Scythians to the west across the Araxes and into the Caspian Steppe, from where they displaced the Cimmerians.

Under Scythian pressure, the Cimmerians migrated to the south through the Klukhor, Alagir and Darial passes in the Greater Caucasus mountains and reached Western Asia, where they would remain active for much of the 7th century BCE.

== Reign ==
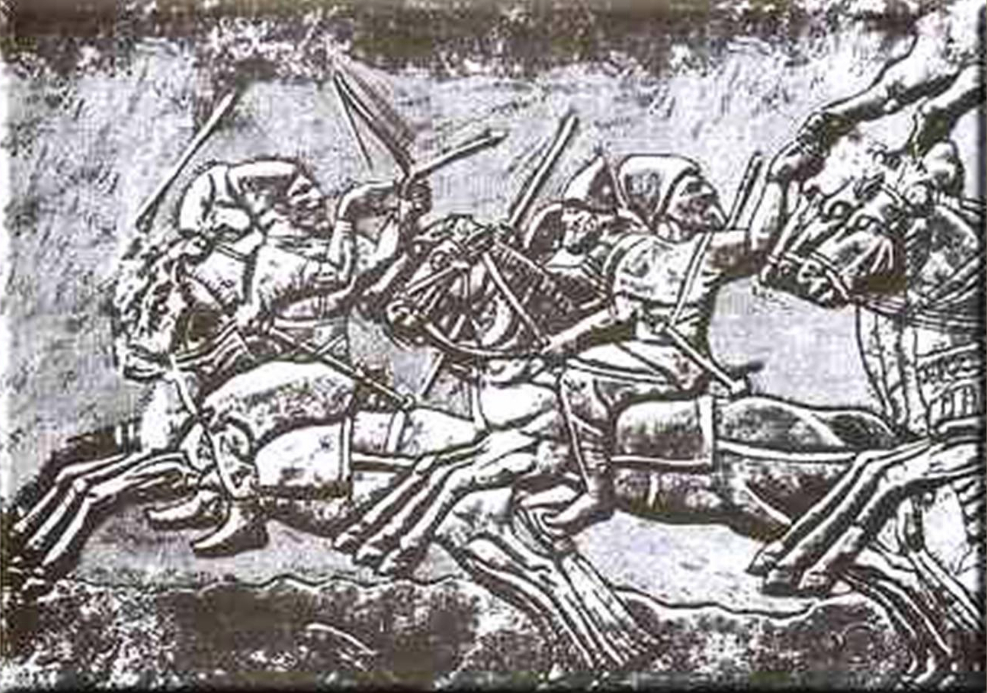
An Assyrian relief depicting Cimmerian mounted warriors

Around 680 BCE, the Cimmerians separated into two groups, with their bulk having migrated to the west into Anatolia, while a smaller group remained in the east, in the area near the kingdom of Mannai and later migrated into Media.

Dugdammî was born shortly before this period, some time before 680 BCE, when the Cimmerians were still living near the northern border of the Neo-Assyrian Empire.

He appears to have succeeded the previous king of the western Cimmerian horde, Teušpā, who was killed in battle near Ḫubušna in Cappadocia against the Assyrian king Esarhaddon in 679 BCE.

=== Destruction of Phrygia ===
Around 675 BCE, the Cimmerians under Dugdammî, in alliance with the Urartian king Rusa II carried out a military campaign to the west, against Muški (Phrygia), Ḫate (the Neo-Hittite state of Melid), and Ḫaliṭu (either the Alizōnes or the Khaldoi); this campaign resulted in the invasion and destruction of the kingdom of Phrygia, whose king Midas committed suicide. The Cimmerians appear to have consequently partially subdued the Phrygians, and an Assyrian oracular text from the later 670s BCE mentioned the Cimmerians and the Phrygians, who had possibly been subdued by the Cimmerians, as allies against the Assyrians' newly conquered province of Meliddu. A document from 673 BCE records Rusa II as having recruited a large number of Cimmerian mercenaries, and Cimmerian allies of Rusa II probably participated in a military expedition of his in 672 BCE. From 671 to 669 BCE, Cimmerians in service of Rusa II attacked the Assyrian province of Šubria near the Urartian border.

=== Activities in Anatolia ===
At yet unknown dates, the Cimmerians imposed their rule on Cappadocia, invaded Bithynia, Paphlagonia and the Troad, and took the recently founded Greek colony of Sinope, whose initial settlement was destroyed and whose first founder Habrōn was killed in the invasion, and which was later re-founded by the Greek colonists Kōos and Krētinēs. Along with Sinope, the Greek colony of Cyzicus was also destroyed during these invasions and had to be later re-founded.

In the beginning of that decade, the Cimmerians attacked the kingdom of Lydia, whose king Gyges contacted the Neo-Assyrian Empire beginning in 667 BCE. Gyges soon defeated the Cimmerians in 665 BCE without Assyrian help, and he sent Cimmerian soldiers captured while attacking the Lydian countryside as gifts to Esarhaddon's successor, Ashurbanipal. According to the Assyrian records describing these events, the Cimmerians already had formed sedentary settlements in Anatolia.

=== Threat against Assyria ===
Assyrian records in 657 BCE of a "bad omen" for the "Westland" might have referred to either another Cimmerian attack on Lydia, or a conquest by Dugdammî of the western possessions of the Neo-Assyrian Empire, possibly Quwê or somewhere in Syria, following their defeat by Gyges. These Cimmerian aggressions worried Esarhaddon about the security of the north-west border of the Neo-Assyrian Empire enough that he sought answers concerning this situation through divination, and as a result of these Cimmerian conquests, by 657 BCE the Assyrian divinatory records were calling the Cimmerian king by the title of šar-kiššati ("King of the Universe"), a title which in the Mesopotamian worldview could belong to only a single ruler in the world at any given time and was normally held by the King of the Neo-Assyrian Empire. These divinatory texts also assured to Esarhaddon that he would eventually regain the kiššūtu, that is the world hegemony, captured by the Cimmerians: the kiššūtu, which was considered to rightfully belong to the Assyrian king, had been usurped by the Cimmerians and had to be won back by Assyria. Thus, the Cimmerians had become a force feared by Esarhaddon, and Dugdammî's successes against Assyria meant that he had become recognised in the ancient Near East as equally powerful as Esarhaddon. This situation remained unchanged throughout the rest of the 650s BCE and the early 640s BCE.

As the result of these Assyrian setbacks, Gyges could not rely on Assyrian support against the Cimmerians and he ended diplomacy with the Neo-Assyrian Empire.

=== Attack on Lydia ===
The Cimmerians under Dugdammî attacked Lydia for a third time in 644 BCE: this time, they defeated the Lydians and captured their capital, Sardis, and Gyges died during this attack. After sacking Sardis, Lygdamis led the Cimmerians into invading the Greek city-states of Ionia and Aeolis on the western coast of Anatolia, which caused the inhabitants of the Batinētis region to flee to the islands of the Aegean Sea, and later Greek writings by Callimachus and Hesychius of Alexandria preserve the record that Lygdamis had destroyed the Artemision of Ephesus during these invasions.

=== Death ===
After this third invasion of Lydia and the attack on the Asiatic Greek cities, around 640 BCE the Cimmerians moved to Cilicia on the north-west border of the Assyrian empire, where Dugdammî allied with Mugallu, the king of Tabal, against Assyria, during which period the Assyrian records called him a "mountain king and an arrogant Gutian (that is a barbarian) who does not know how to fear the gods." However, after facing a revolt against himself, Dugdammî allied with Assyria and acknowledged Assyrian overlordship, and sent tribute to Ashurbanipal, to whom he swore an oath. Dugdammî soon broke this oath and attacked the Assyrian Empire again, but he fell ill and died in 640 BCE, and was succeeded by his son Sandakšatru, who attempted to continue Dugdammî's attacks against Assyria but failed just like his father.

=== Legacy ===
Due to the fame of Dugdammî, or possibly due to intermarriages between Cimmerian and Carian rulers at the time when the Cimmerians were operating in western Anatolia in the 7th century BCE, the name of this king was adopted by Carians, such as the satrap Lygdamis I of Halicarnassus and his great-grandson, the tyrant Lygdamis II of Halicarnassus. From Caria, this name also spread among the ancient Greeks, and was borne by the tyrant Lygdamis of Naxos, as well as by a champion of the Olympic Games from the city of Syracuse in Sicily who was also named Lygdamis.

== Sources ==
- Barnett, R. D. (1991). "Urartu". In Boardman, John; Edwards, I. E. S.; Hammond, N. G. L.; Sollberger, E. (eds.). The Prehistory of the Balkans; and the Middle East and the Aegean world, tenth to eighth centuries B.C. The Cambridge Ancient History. Vol. 3. Cambridge, United Kingdom: Cambridge University Press. pp. 314–371. ISBN 978-1-139-05428-7.
- Brinkman, J. A. (1991). "Babylonia in the Shadow of Assyria". In Boardman, John; Edwards, I. E. S.; Hammond, N. G. L.; Sollberger, E.; Walker, C. B. F. (eds.). The Assyrian and Babylonian Empires and other States of the Near East, from the Eighth to the Sixth Centuries B.C. The Cambridge Ancient History. Vol. 3. Cambridge, United Kingdom: Cambridge University Press. pp. 1–70. ISBN 978-1-139-05429-4.
- Diakonoff, I. M. (1985). "Media". In Gershevitch, Ilya (ed.). The Median and Achaemenian Periods. The Cambridge History of Iran. Vol. 2. Cambridge, United Kingdom: Cambridge University Press. ISBN 978-0-521-20091-2.
- Graham, A. J. (1982). "The colonial expansion of Greece". In Boardman, John; Hammond, N. G. L. (eds.). The Expansion of the Greek World, Eighth to Sixth Centuries B.C. The Cambridge Ancient History. Vol. 3. Cambridge, United Kingdom: Cambridge University Press. pp. 83–162. ISBN 978-0-521-23447-4.
- Ivantchik, Askold (1993). Les Cimmériens au Proche-Orient [The Cimmerians in the Near East] (PDF) (in French). Fribourg, Switzerland; Göttingen, Germany: Éditions Universitaires Fribourg (Switzerland); Vandenhoeck & Ruprecht (Germany). ISBN 978-3-727-80876-0.
- Ivantchik, Askold (2010). "Sinope et les Cimmériens" [Sinope and the Cimmerians]. Ancient Civilizations from Scythia to Siberia (in French). 16 (1–2): 65–72. doi:10.1163/157005711X560318.
- Novák, Ľubomír (2013). Problem of Archaism and Innovation in the Eastern Iranian Languages. Charles University.
- Novotny, Jamie; Jeffers, Joshua (2018). The Royal Inscriptions of Ashurbanipal (668–631 BC), Aššur-etel-ilāni (630–627 BC), and Sînšarraiškun (626–612 BC), Kings of Assyria. Vol. 1. University Park, United States: Eisenbrauns. p. 309. ISBN 978-1-575-06997-5.
- Olbrycht, Marek Jan (2000a). "The Cimmerian Problem Re-Examined: the Evidence of the Classical Sources". In Pstrusińska, Jadwiga [in Polish]; Fear, Andrew (eds.). Collectanea Celto-Asiatica Cracoviensia. Kraków: Księgarnia Akademicka. pp. 71–100. ISBN 978-8-371-88337-8.
- Olbrycht, Marek Jan (2000b). "Remarks on the Presence of Iranian Peoples in Europe and Their Asiatic Relations". In Pstrusińska, Jadwiga [in Polish]; Fear, Andrew (eds.). Collectanea Celto-Asiatica Cracoviensia. Kraków: Księgarnia Akademicka. pp. 101–140. ISBN 978-8-371-88337-8.
- Spalinger, Anthony J. (1978). "The Date of the Death of Gyges and Its Historical Implications". Journal of the American Oriental Society. 98 (4): 400–409. doi:10.2307/599752. JSTOR 599752.
- Sulimirski, Tadeusz; Taylor, T. F. (1991). "The Scythians". In Boardman, John; Edwards, I. E. S.; Hammond, N. G. L.; Sollberger, E.; Walker, C. B. F. (eds.). The Assyrian and Babylonian Empires and other States of the Near East, from the Eighth to the Sixth Centuries B.C. The Cambridge Ancient History. Vol. 3. Cambridge, United Kingdom: Cambridge University Press. pp. 547–590. ISBN 978-1-139-05429-4.
- Tokhtas’ev, Sergei R. [in Russian] (1991). "Cimmerians". Encyclopædia Iranica. New York City, United States: Encyclopædia Iranica Foundation; Brill Publishers.
- Tokhtas’ev, Sergei R. [in Russian] (2007). "Der Name des kimmerischen Königs Lygdamis" [The name of the Cimmerian king Lygdamis]. Milesische Forschungen [Milesian Studies] (in German). 5: 607–612.
- Tuplin, Christopher (2004). "Medes in Media, Mesopotamia, and Anatolia: Empire, Hegemony, Domination or Illusion?". Ancient West & East. Vol. 3. pp. 223–251. doi:10.1163/9789047405870_002. ISBN 9789047405870. S2CID 245898469.
- Tuplin, Christopher (2013). "Intolerable Clothes & A Terrifying Name: The Characteristics of an Achaemenid Invasion Force". Bulletin of the Institute of Classical Studies. 124: 223–239.
- Vitchak, K. T. (1999). "Скифский язык: опыт описания" [The Scythian Language: Attempt at Description]. Вопросы языкознания [Questions of Linguistics] (in Russian). 5: 50–59.

Dugdammî Dugdammî's dynasty Died: 640 BCE
Regnal titles
Preceded by Teušpā	King of the Cimmerians; 679-640 BCE	Succeeded by Sandakšatru
