= Sadyattes =

Ancient king of Lydia

King of Lydia
- Reign: 637-c. 635 BC
- Predecessor: Ardys
- Successor: Alyattes
- Died: c. 635 BC (?)
- Spouse: Lyde
- Issue: Alyattes
- Dynasty: Mermnad dynasty
- Father: Ardys

Sadyattes (Ancient Greek: Σαδυάττης, romanized: Saduattēs; Latin: Sadyattēs; reigned 637–c. 635 BC) was the third king of the Mermnad dynasty in Lydia, the son of Ardys and the grandson of Gyges of Lydia. Sadyattes reigned 12 years according to Herodotus.

== Reign ==
=== Background ===
Sadyattes came to power during period of severe crisis that Lydia was facing because of several waves of invasions by the Cimmerians, a nomadic people from the Eurasian Steppe who had invaded the Western Asia. The Cimmerians attacked Lydia several times but had been repelled by Sadyattes's grandfather, Gyges, but in 644 BC, the Cimmerians attacked Lydia for the third time, led by their king Lygdamis. The Lydians were defeated, Sardis was sacked, and Gyges was killed, following which he was succeeded by his son, Ardys, who was the father of Sadyattes.

In 637 BC, that is in Ardys's seventh regnal year, the Thracian Treres tribe who had migrated across the Thracian Bosporus and invaded Anatolia, under their king Kobos, and in alliance with the Cimmerians and the Lycians, attacked Lydia. They defeated the Lydians again and for a second time sacked the Lydian capital of Sardis, except for its citadel. It is probable that Ardys was killed during this Cimmerian attack, or that he was deposed for being unable to protect Lydia from the Cimmerian attacks.

=== Reign ===
Sadyattes's reign was even more short-lived than that of his father Ardys: although Herodotus claimed that Ardys had reigned for twelve years, modern estimates give him a much shorter reign of only two years. Little is known about the reign of Sadyattes except that he began a war with the Ionian Greek maritime city of Miletus.

=== End of reign ===
Sadyattes's reign ended in 635 BC. It is possible that, like his grandfather Gyges, he died fighting the Cimmerians. Alternatively, Sadyattes might have been deposed for failing to protect Lydia from the Cimmerian attacks. He was succeeded by his son Alyattes, who continued the war against Miletus and would transform Lydia into a powerful empire.

=== Aftermath ===
Soon after 635 BC, with Assyrian approval and in alliance with the Lydians, the Scythians under their king Madyes entered Anatolia, expelled the Treres from Asia Minor, and defeated the Cimmerians so that they no longer constituted a threat again, following which the Scythians extended their domination to Central Anatolia until they were themselves expelled by the Medes from Western Asia in the 600s BC. This final defeat of the Cimmerians was carried out by the joint forces of Madyes, whom Strabo credits with expelling the Treres and Cimmerians from Asia Minor, and of Sadyattes's son, the king Alyattes of Lydia, whom Herodotus and Polyaenus claim finally defeated the Cimmerians.

== Sources ==
- Diakonoff, I. M. (1985). "Media". In Gershevitch, Ilya (ed.). The Cambridge History of Iran. Vol. 2. Cambridge, United Kingdom: Cambridge University Press. pp. 94–95. ISBN 978-0-521-20091-2.
- Herodotus (1975) [first published 1954]. Burn, A. R.; de Sélincourt, Aubrey (eds.). The Histories. London: Penguin Books. ISBN 0-14-051260-8.
- Ivantchik, Askold (1993). Les Cimmériens au Proche-Orient [The Cimmerians in the Near East] (PDF) (in French). Fribourg, Switzerland; Göttingen, Germany: Éditions Universitaires Fribourg (Switzerland); Vandenhoeck & Ruprecht (Germany). ISBN 978-3-727-80876-0.
- Ivantchik, Askold (2006). Aruz, Joan; Farkas, Ann; Fino, Elisabetta Valtz (eds.). The Golden Deer of Eurasia: Perspectives on the Steppe Nomads of the Ancient World. New Haven, United States; New York City, United States; London, United Kingdom: The Metropolitan Museum of Art; Yale University Press. p. 146-153. ISBN 978-1-588-39205-3.

Mermnad dynasty Died: c. 635 BC
Regnal titles
Preceded by Ardys	King of Lydia; 637–c. 635 BC	Succeeded by Alyattes
