= Bartatua =

King of the Scythians
- Reign: c. 679-c. 658/9 BCE
- Predecessor: Išpakaia
- Successor: Madyes
- Died: c. 658/9 BCE
- Spouse: Šērūʾa-ēṭirat (?)
- Issue: Madyes
- Scythian: *Pr̥ϑutavah or *Pṛtatavah
- Father: Išpakaia (?)
- Religion: Scythian religion

Bartatua or Protothyes was a Scythian king who ruled during the period of the Scythian presence in Western Asia in the 7th century BCE.

== Name ==
The Akkadian name Partatua or Bartatua (𒁹𒁇𒋫𒌅𒀀) and the Ancient Greek name Protothues (Προτοθύης, whence Latin: Protothyes) are derived from a Scythian language name whose original form was either *Pr̥ϑutavah, meaning "with far-reaching strength," or *Pr̥tatavah, meaning "mighty in battle."

== Historical background ==
In the 8th and 7th centuries BCE, a significant movement of the nomads of the Eurasian steppe brought the Scythians into Southwest Asia. This movement started when another nomadic Iranic tribe closely related to the Scythians, either the Massagetae or the Issedones, migrated westwards, in turn pushing the Scythians further west across the Araxes river, following which they moved into the Caspian Steppe from where they displaced the Cimmerians.

Under Scythian pressure, the Cimmerians migrated to the south along the coast of the Black Sea and reached Anatolia, and the Scythians in turn later expanded to the south, following the coast of the Caspian Sea and arrived in the steppes in the Northern Caucasus, from where they expanded into the region of present-day Azerbaijan, where they settled and turned eastern Transcaucasia into their centre of operations in Western Asia until the early 6th century BCE, with this presence in Western Asia being an extension of the Scythian kingdom of the steppes. During this period, the Scythian kings' headquarters were located in the steppes to the north of Caucasus, and contact with the civilisation of Western Asia would have an important influence on the formation of Scythian culture.

== Life and reign ==
Bartatua was the successor of the previous Scythian king, Išpakaia, and might have been his son. After Išpakaia had attacked the Neo-Assyrian Empire and died in battle against the Assyrian king Esarhaddon around 676 BCE, Bartatua succeeded him.

In the later mid-670s BCE, in alliance with an eastern group of the Cimmerians who had migrated into the Iranian plateau, Bartatua's Scythians were menacing the Assyrian provinces of Parsumaš and Bīt Ḫamban, and these joint Cimmerian-Scythian forces together were threatening communication between the Assyrian Empire and its vassal of Ḫubuškia. However, the Assyrians had started negotiations with Bartatua immediately after Išpakaia's death, and in 672 BCE he asked for the hand of one of Esarhaddon's daughters in marriage, which is attested in Esarhaddon's questions to the oracle of the Sun-god Šamaš, though her name is not stated. Whether this marriage did happen is not recorded in the Assyrian texts, but the close alliance between the Scythians and Assyria under the reigns of Bartatua and his son and successor Madyes suggests that the Assyrian priests did approve of this marriage between a daughter of an Assyrian king and a nomadic lord, which had never happened before in Assyrian history; the Scythians were thus brought into a marital alliance with Assyria, and Esarhaddon's daughter was possibly the mother or grandmother of Bartatua's son or grandson, Madyes.

Bartatua's marriage to Esarhaddon's daughter required that he would pledge allegiance to Assyria as a vassal, and in accordance to Assyrian law, the territories ruled by him would be his fief granted by the Assyrian king, which made the Scythian presence in Western Asia a nominal extension of the Neo-Assyrian Empire. Under this arrangement, the power of the Scythians in Western Asia heavily depended on their cooperation with the Assyrian Empire; henceforth, the Scythians remained allies of the Assyrian Empire. Around this time, the Urartian king Rusa II might also have enlisted Scythian troops to guard his western borderlands.

Over the course of 660 to 659 BCE, Esarhaddon's son and successor to the Assyrian throne, Ashurbanipal, sent his general Nabû-šar-uṣur to carry out a military campaign against Mannai, who had previously, in alliance with Bartatua's predecessor Išpakaia, expanded their territories at the expense of Assyria. After trying in vain to stop the Assyrian advance, the Mannaean king Aḫsēri was overthrown by a popular rebellion and was killed along with most of his dynasty by the revolting populace, after which his surviving son Ualli requested help from Assyria, which was provided through the intermediary of Ashurbanipal's relative, the Scythian king, after which the Scythians extended their hegemony to Mannai itself.

The marital alliance between the Scythian king and the Assyrian ruling dynasty, as well as the proximity of the Scythians with the Assyrian-influenced Mannai and Urartu placed the Scythians under the strong influence of Assyrian culture.

Bartatua was succeeded by his son, Madyes, who would bring Scythian power in Western Asia to its peak.

=== Legacy ===
Graeco-Roman authors confused Bartatua with his predecessors and successors, including his son Madyes, into a single figure by claiming that it was Madyes himself who led the Scythians from Central Asia into chasing the Cimmerians out of their homeland and then defeating the Medes and the legendary Egyptian king Sesostris and imposing their rule over Asia for many years before returning to Scythia. Later Graeco-Roman authors named this Scythian king as Idanthyrsos or Tanausis, although this Idanthyrsos is a legendary figure separate from the later historical Scythian king Idanthyrsus, from whom the Graeco-Romans derived merely his name. According to one theory, the legendary Armenian king Paroyr Skayordi mentioned in the history of Movses Khorenatsi is identifiable with Bartatua.

== See also ==
- Sakez
- Median kingdom

== Sources ==
- Barnett, R. D. (1991). "Urartu". In Boardman, John; Edwards, I. E. S.; Hammond, N. G. L.; Sollberger, E. (eds.). The Cambridge Ancient History. Vol. 3. Cambridge: Cambridge University Press. pp. 314–371. ISBN 978-1-139-05428-7.
- Bukharin, Mikhail Dmitrievich [in Russian] (2011). "Колаксай и его братья (античная традиция о происхождении царской власти у скифов" [Kolaxais and his Brothers (Classical Tradition on the Origin of the Royal Power of the Scythians)]. Аристей: вестник классической филологии и античной истории (in Russian). 3: 20–80.
- Delaunay, J. A. (1987). "ASSARHADDON". Encyclopædia Iranica.
- Diakonoff, I. M. (1985). "Media". In Gershevitch, Ilya (ed.). The Cambridge History of Iran. Vol. 2. Cambridge: Cambridge University Press. pp. 94–95. ISBN 978-0-521-20091-2.
- Harmatta, János (1996). "10.4.1. The Scythians". In Hermann, Joachim; Zürcher, Erik; Harmatta, János; Litvak, J. K.; Lonis, R. [in French]; Obenga, T.; Thapar, R.; Zhou, Yiliang (eds.). From the Seventh Century B.C. to the Seventh Century A.D. History of Humanity. Vol. 3. London, United Kingdom; New York City, United States; Paris, France: Routledge; UNESCO. ISBN 978-9-231-02812-0.
- Harmatta, János (1999). "Herodotus, Historian of the Cimmerians and the Scythians". In Reverdin, Olivier [in French]; Nenci, Giuseppe [in Italian] (eds.). Hérodote et les Peuples Non Grecs [Herodotus and the Non-Greek Peoples] (in French). Vandœuvres, Switzerland: Fondation Hardt pour l’étude de l’Antiquité classique. pp. 115–130. ISBN 978-3-774-92415-4.
- Ivantchik, Askold (1993). Les Cimmériens au Proche-Orient [The Cimmerians in the Near East] (PDF) (in French). Fribourg, Switzerland; Göttingen, Germany: Éditions Universitaires Fribourg (Switzerland); Vandenhoeck & Ruprecht (Germany). ISBN 978-3-727-80876-0.
- Ivantchik, Askold (1999). "The Scythian 'Rule Over Asia': the Classical Tradition and the Historical Reality". In Tsetskhladze, G.R. (ed.). Ancient Greeks West and East. Leiden, Netherlands; Boston, United States: BRILL. ISBN 978-90-04-11190-5.
- Ivantchik, Askold (2018). "SCYTHIANS". Encyclopædia Iranica.
- Kullanda, S. V. [in Russian]; Raevskiy, D. S. [in Russian] (2004). "Эминак в ряду владык Скифии" [Eminakes, King of Scythia] (PDF). Вестник древней истории [Journal of Ancient History] (in Russian). 248 (1): 79–95.
- Melikov, Rauf (2016). "Скифские этнонимы и антропонимы в древневосточных клинописных текстах" [Scythian Ethnonyms and Anthroponyms in Ancient Eastern Cuneiform Texts]. Вопросы эпиграфики [Questions of Epigraphy]. 9: 74–96.
- Olbrycht, Marek Jan (2000a). "The Cimmerian Problem Re-Examined: the Evidence of the Classical Sources". In Pstrusińska, Jadwiga [in Polish]; Fear, Andrew (eds.). Collectanea Celto-Asiatica Cracoviensia. Kraków: Księgarnia Akademicka. pp. 71–100. ISBN 978-8-371-88337-8.
- Olbrycht, Marek Jan (2000b). "Remarks on the Presence of Iranian Peoples in Europe and Their Asiatic Relations". In Pstrusińska, Jadwiga [in Polish]; Fear, Andrew (eds.). Collectanea Celto-Asiatica Cracoviensia. Kraków: Księgarnia Akademicka. pp. 101–140. ISBN 978-8-371-88337-8.
- Russell, James R. (1982). Zoroastrianism in Armenia (PhD thesis). University of London, School of Oriental and African Studies. ProQuest 1977402868.
- Schmitt, Rüdiger (2000). "PROTOTHYES". Encyclopædia Iranica.
- Spalinger, Anthony (1978). "Psammetichus, King of Egypt: II". Journal of the American Research Center in Egypt. 15: 49–57. doi:10.2307/40000130. JSTOR 40000130.
- Sulimirski, Tadeusz; Taylor, T. F. (1991). "The Scythians". In Boardman, John; Edwards, I. E. S.; Hammond, N. G. L.; Sollberger, E.; Walker, C. B. F. (eds.). The Cambridge Ancient History. Vol. 3. Cambridge: Cambridge University Press. pp. 547–590. ISBN 978-1-139-05429-4.

Bartatua Bartatua's dynasty Died: c. 658/9 BCE
Regnal titles
Preceded by Išpakaia	King of the Scythians c. 679–c. 658/9 BCE	Succeeded by Madyes
