= Scythian invasion of Media =

- Part of Madyes' Western Asian campaign
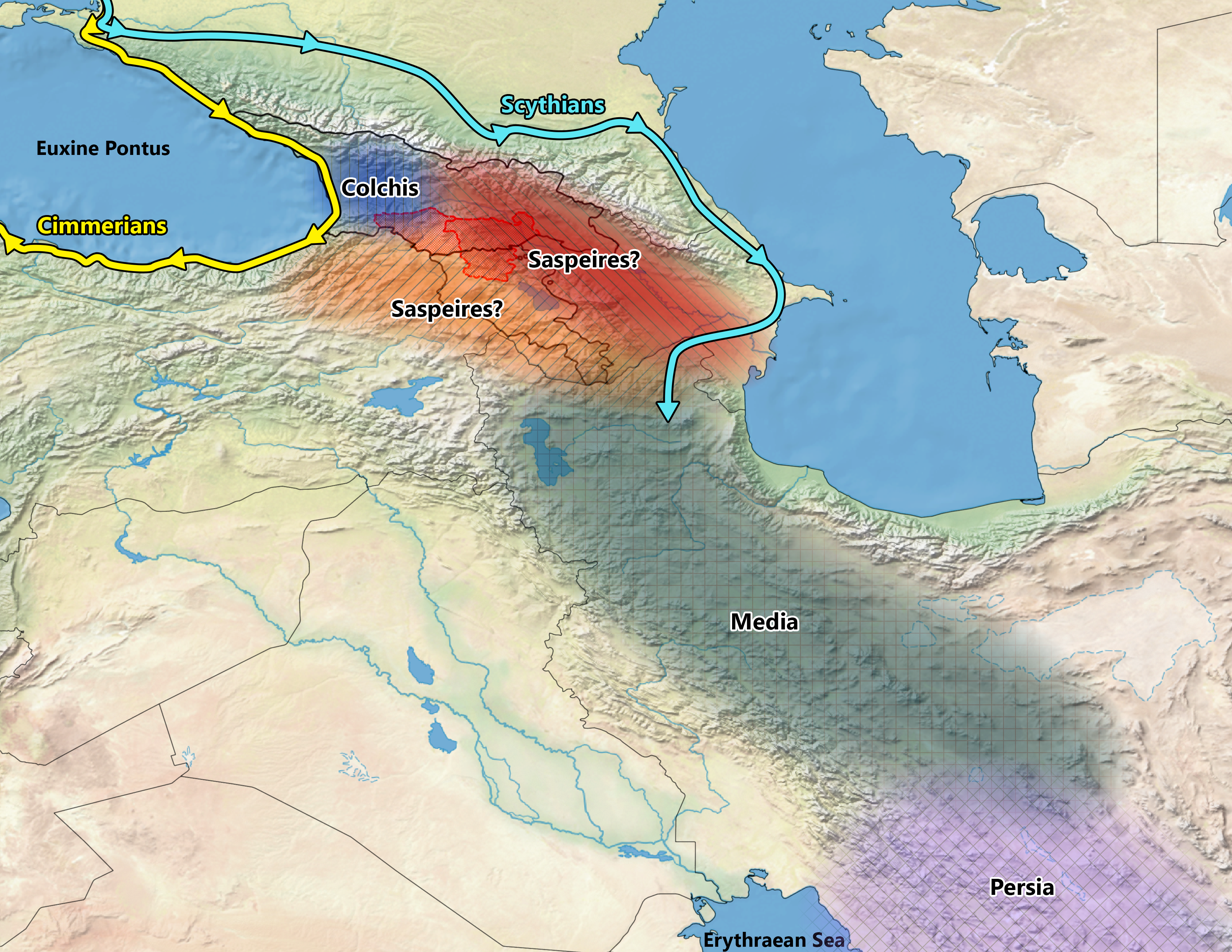
- Scythian movements into Media and the Near East during the 7th century BC
Date	c. 653–625 BC
Location	Media, northwestern Iran
Result	Scythian victory (initial conquest; see Aftermath)
Territorial changes	Temporary Scythian control over Media; later restored to the Medes under Cyaxares

Belligerents
Scythians	Medes

Commanders and leaders
Madyes	Phraortes †; Cyaxares

Strength
Unknown	Unknown

Casualties and losses
Unknown	Heavy; King Phraortes killed
- Sources primarily from Herodotus; exact numbers and details uncertain

The Scythian invasion of Media was a military campaign by the Scythians, led by Madyes, which resulted in the establishment of Scythian rule over the Medes. Following the invasion, Media was under Scythian rule and paid them tribute between 652–625 BCE.

== Background ==
The Scythians conducted raids into Mesopotamia and reached Media at least from the early 680s BCE.

== Invasion of Media ==
=== The Scythians’ arrival ===
George Rawlinson, in the book ‘‘Media; Babylonia; Persia’’, wrote:

"When Cyaxares was informed of the invasion, he quickly sent his army to engage the Scythians. The Medes expected that if they lost the battle, they could still fortify their major cities and resist the invaders. Both armies were well-prepared, though Cyaxares’s forces were more organized and experienced."

The Scythian king Madyes was victorious in the engagement, forcing Cyaxares to accept Scythian suzerainty and pay tribute annually. Cyaxares retained his royal title and administration over Media.

=== Early Scythian rule ===
There is no clear evidence that the Scythians caused widespread destruction in Media. Their main imposition was repeated tribute demands, sometimes exceeding agreed amounts. Despite this, their rule was relatively peaceful compared to neighboring Assyria, as Media was less wealthy and strategically less critical. Consequently, Scythian rule did not severely disrupt Media’s prosperity.

=== End of Scythian rule and aftermath ===
Scythian rule over Media ended when Cyaxares restored Median independence. According to sources, he invited the Scythian leaders to a feast and killed them, reestablishing full control over Media.

In the aftermath Media regained sovereignty and ceased tribute payments.The Scythian influence in the region ended, though some northern steppe connections persisted. This transition marked the beginning of Cyaxares’s consolidation of the Median Empire, which later became a significant power in the Near East.
