= Išpakāya =

King of the Scythians
- Reign: unknown - c. 679 BCE
- Predecessor: unknown
- Successor: Bartatua
- Died: c. 679 BCE
- Issue: Bartatua (?)
- Scythian: *Spakayah
- Religion: Scythian religion

Išpakāya was a Scythian king who ruled during the period of the Scythian presence in Western Asia in the 7th century BCE.

== Name ==
Išpakāya (𒁹𒅖𒉺𒅗𒀀𒀀) is the Akkadian form of the Scythian name *Spakayah, which was a hypocorostic derivation of the word *spaka, meaning "dog."

== Historical background ==
In the 8th and 7th centuries BCE, a significant movement of the nomads of the Eurasian steppe brought the Scythians into Southwest Asia. This movement started when another nomadic Iranic tribe closely related to the Scythians, either the Massagetae or the Issedones, migrated westwards, forcing the Early Scythians to the west across the Araxes river (or the Volga), following which the Scythians moved into the Cimmerian territory.

Under Scythian pressure, the Cimmerians migrated to the south along the coast of the Black Sea and reached Anatolia, and the Scythians in turn later expanded to the south, following the coast of the Caspian Sea and arrived in the steppes in the Northern Caucasus, from where they expanded into the region of present-day Azerbaijan, where they settled and turned eastern Transcaucasia into their centre of operations in Western Asia until the early 6th century BCE, with this presence in Western Asia being an extension of the Scythian kingdom of the steppes. During this period, the Scythian kings' headquarters were located in the steppes to the north of the Caucasus, and contact with the civilization of Western Asia would have an important influence on the formation of Scythian culture.

== Reign ==
During the earliest phase of their presence in Western Asia, Išpakāya's Scythians were allied with the Cimmerians, and the two groups, in alliance with the Medes, who were an Iranic people of Western Asia to whom the Scythians and Cimmerians were distantly related, were threatening the eastern frontier of the kingdom of Urartu during the reign of its king Argishti II, who reigned from 714 to 680 BCE. Argishti II's successor, Rusa II, built several fortresses in the east of Urartu, including that of Teishebaini, to monitor and repel attacks by the Cimmerians, the Mannaeans, the Medes, and the Scythians.

The first mention of the Scythians in the records of the then superpower of Western Asia, the Neo-Assyrian Empire, is from between 680/679 and 678/677 BCE, when Išpakāya joined an alliance with the Mannaeans and the Cimmerians in an attack on the Neo-Assyrian Empire. During this time, the Scythians under Išpakāya, allied to Rusa II of Urartu, were raiding as far in the south as the Assyrian province of Zamua. These allied forces were defeated by the Assyrian king Esarhaddon.

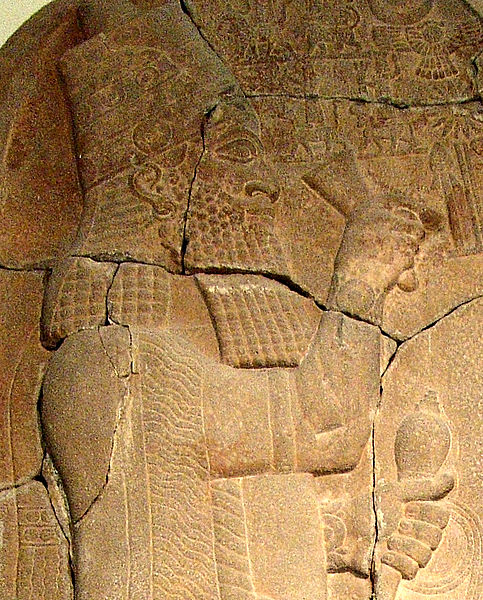
The Assyrian king Esarhaddon.

The Mannaeans, in alliance with an eastern group of the Cimmerians who had migrated into the Iranian plateau and with the Scythians (the latter of whom attacked the borderlands of Assyria from across the territory of the kingdom of Ḫubuškia), were able to expand their territories at the expense of Assyria and capture the fortresses of Šarru-iqbi and Dūr-Ellil. Negotiations between the Assyrians and the Cimmerians appeared to have followed, according to which the Cimmerians promised not to interfere in the relations between Assyria and Mannai, although a Babylonian diviner in Assyrian service warned Esarhaddon not to trust either the Mannaeans or the Cimmerians and advised him to spy on both of them. In 676 BCE, Esarhaddon responded by carrying out a military campaign against Mannai during which he killed Išpakāya.

Išpakāya was succeeded by Bartatua, who might have been his son and who allied with Assyria. Bartatua's son, and therefore Išpakāya's possible grandson, Madyes, would bring Scythian power in Western Asia to its peak.

=== Legacy ===
Graeco-Roman authors confused Išpakāya with his predecessors and successors, including his possible grandson Madyes, into a single figure by claiming that it was Madyes himself who led the Scythians from Central Asia into chasing the Cimmerians out of their homeland and then defeating the Medes and the legendary Egyptian king Sesostris and imposing their rule over Asia for many years before returning to Scythia. Later Graeco-Roman authors identified this Scythian king as Idanthyrsos or Tanausis, although this Idanthyrsos is a legendary figure separate from the later historical Scythian king Idanthyrsus, from whom the Graeco-Romans derived merely his name.

== Sources ==
- Barnett, R. D. (1991). "Urartu". In Boardman, John; Edwards, I. E. S.; Hammond, N. G. L.; Sollberger, E. (eds.). The Cambridge Ancient History. Vol. 3. Cambridge: Cambridge University Press. pp. 314–371. ISBN 978-1-139-05428-7.
- Delaunay, J. A. (1987). "Assarhaddon". Encyclopædia Iranica.
- Diakonoff, I. M. (1985). "Media". In Gershevitch, Ilya (ed.). The Cambridge History of Iran: Volume. Vol. 2. Cambridge: Cambridge University Press. ISBN 978-0-521-20091-2.
- Ivantchik, Askold (1993). Les Cimmériens au Proche-Orient [The Cimmerians in the Near East] (PDF) (in French). Fribourg, Switzerland; Göttingen, Germany: Éditions Universitaires Fribourg (Switzerland); Vandenhoeck & Ruprecht (Germany). ISBN 978-3-727-80876-0.
- Ivantchik, Askold (1999). "The Scythian 'Rule Over Asia': the Classical Tradition and the Historical Reality". In Tsetskhladze, G.R. (ed.). Ancient Greeks West and East. Leiden, Netherlands; Boston, United States: BRILL. ISBN 978-90-04-11190-5.
- Ivantchik, Askold I. (2005). Накануне колонизации. Северное Причерноморье и степные кочевники VIII – VII вв. до н.э. в античной литературной традиции: фольклор, литература и история [On the eve of Colonisation. The Northern Black Sea Region and the Steppe Nomads of the 8th - 7th centuries BC in the Ancient Literary Tradition: Folklore, Literature and History]. Berlin, Germany; Moscow, Russia: Eurasien-Abteilung des Deutschen Archäologischen Instituts (Germany); Центр сравнительного изучения древних цивилизаций Института всеобщей истории РАН (Russia); Paleograph Press. ISBN 978-5-895-26015-9.
- Ivantchik, Askold (2018). "Scythians". Encyclopædia Iranica.
- Schmitt, Rüdiger (2009). Iranisches Personennamenbuch [Book of Iranian Personal Names] (in German). Vol. 7.1a. Verlag der Österreichischen Akademie der Wissenschaften. ISBN 978-3-700-16608-5.
- Schmitt, Rüdiger (10 April 2018). "SCYTHIAN LANGUAGE". Encyclopaedia Iranica.
- Spalinger, Anthony (1978). "Psammetichus, King of Egypt: II". Journal of the American Research Center in Egypt. 15: 49–57. doi:10.2307/40000130. JSTOR 40000130.
- Grayson, A. K. (1991). "Assyria: Sennacherib and Esarhaddon". In Boardman, John; Edwards, I. E. S.; Hammond, N. G. L.; Sollberger, E.; Walker, C. B. F. (eds.). The Cambridge Ancient History. Vol. 3. Cambridge: Cambridge University Press. pp. 103–141. ISBN 978-1-139-05429-4.
- Sulimirski, Tadeusz; Taylor, T. F. (1991). "The Scythians". In Boardman, John; Edwards, I. E. S.; Hammond, N. G. L.; Sollberger, E.; Walker, C. B. F. (eds.). The Cambridge Ancient History. Vol. 3. Cambridge: Cambridge University Press. pp. 547–590. ISBN 978-1-139-05429-4.

Išpakāya Died: c. 679 BCE
Regnal titles
Unknown	King of the Scythians ?–c. 679 BCE	Succeeded by Bartatua
