= Idanthyrsus =

Scythian king ruling in the and 6th-century BC

King of the Scythians
- Reign: c. 513 BCE
- Predecessor: Saulius
- Successor: Ariapeithes (?)
- Dynasty: Spargapeithes's dynasty
- Father: Saulius
- Religion: Scythian religion

Idanthyrsus (Ancient Greek: Ἰδάνθυρσος, romanized: Idánthursos; Latin: Idanthyrsus) is the name of a Scythian king who lived in the 6th century BCE, when he faced an invasion of his country by the Persian Achaemenid Empire.

== Name and etymology ==
The name Idánthursos (Ἰδάνθυρσος) is the Hellenized form of a Scythian name whose original form is not attested. The Scythian name has been tentatively suggested by Ferdinand Justi and Josef Markwart to have been composed of the Iranian term *Vinda(t)- "finding, attaining" or *Vidant. However, the Iranic sound /d/ had evolved into /δ/ in Proto-Scythian, and later evolved into /l/ in Scythian.

The linguist Martin Schwartz has instead reconstructed the original Scythian form of Idanthursos as *Hiθāmθrauša, meaning "prospering the ally", with the final part modified into -θυρσος, referring to the composite vegetal wand of Bacchus, in Greek because the ancient Greeks associated Scythian peoples with Bacchic rites.

== Life ==
=== Background ===
Idanthyrsus was the son of his predecessor, the Scythian king Saulius, who was himself the brother and slayer of Anacharsis.

=== Persian invasion ===
In his Histories, Herodotus records an exchange between Idanthyrsus and the Persian king Darius I of Persia, upon the latter's invasion of Scythia (c. 513 BC). The Scythians having repeatedly retreated before him, Darius sends a message to the Scythian king, calling upon him either to fight or submit; Herodotus recounts the dialogue thus, starting with the message of Darius to Idanthyrsus:

Thou strange man, why dost thou keep on flying before me, when there are two things thou mightest do easily? If thou deemest thyself able to resist my arms, cease thy wanderings and come, let us engage in battle. Or if thou art conscious that my strength is greater than thine—even so thou shouldest cease to run away—thou hast but to bring thy lord earth and water, and to come at once to a conference.

To which the Scythian king replied:

This is my way, Persian. I never fear men or fly from them. I have not done so in times past, nor do I now fly from thee. There is nothing new or strange in what I do; I only follow my common mode of life in peaceful years. Now I will tell thee why I do not at once join battle with thee. We Scythians have neither towns nor cultivated lands, which might induce us, through fear of their being taken or ravaged, to be in a hurry to fight with you. If, however, you must needs to come to blows with us speedily, look you now, there are our fathers' tombs (Note: Rather, the tombs of the kings seem to be meant here.)—seek them out, and attempt to meddle with them. Till ye do this, be sure we shall not join battle, unless it pleases us. This is my answer to the challenge to fight. As for lords, I acknowledge only Jove, my ancestor, and Hestia, the Scythian queen. (Note: Herodotus equates the indigenous Scythian gods Papaios and Tabiti to Zeus and Hestia respectively.) "Earth and water", the tribute thou askedst, I do not send, but thou shalt receive soon receive more suitable gifts. Last of all, in return for thy calling thyself my lord, I say to thee, "Go weep".

=== Legacy ===
Graeco-Roman authors confused several early Scythian kings such as Išpakaia, Protothyes, and Madyes, into a single figure, also named Madyes, who led Scythians into defeating the Medes and the legendary Egyptian king Sesōstris, before imposing their rule over Asia for many years before returning to Scythia. Later Graeco-Roman authors named this Scythian king as Idanthyrsos or Tanausis, although this Idanthyrsos is a legendary figure separate from the later historical Scythian king Idanthyrsos, from whom the Graeco-Romans derived merely his name.

== Sources ==
- Herodotus (2015). The Histories. Knopf Doubleday Publishing Group. ISBN 978-0375712715.
- Ivantchik, Askold I. (1999). "Une légende sur l'origine des Scythes (HDT. IV 5-7) et le problème des sources du Scythicos logos d'Hérodote" [A Legend on the Origin of the Scythians (Hdt. IV 5-7) and the problems of the sources of Herodotus's Scythicos logos]. Revue des Études Grecques [Review of Greek Studies] (in French). 112 (1): 141–192. doi:10.3406/reg.1999.4355. JSTOR 44260011.
- Schmitt, Rüdiger (2003). "Die skythischen Personennamen bei Herodot" [Scythian Personal Names in Herodotus] (PDF). Annali dell'Università degli Studi di Napoli l'Orientale (in German). 63: 1–31.
- Schmitt, Rüdiger (2011). Iranisches Personennamenbuch [Book of Iranian Personal Names] (in German). Vol. 5.5a. Verlag der Österreichischen Akademie der Wissenschaften. ISBN 978-3-700-17142-3.
- Schwartz, Martin; Manaster Ramer, Alexis (2019). "Some Interlinguistic Iranian Conundrums". In Hintze, Almut; Durkin, Desmond; Naumann, Claudius (eds.). A Thousand Judgements: Festschrift for Maria Macuch. Wiesbaden, Germany: Harrassowitz Verlag. pp. 357–362. ISBN 978-3-447-11094-5.
- Spalinger, Anthony (1978). "Psammetichus, King of Egypt: II". Journal of the American Research Center in Egypt. 15: 49–57. doi:10.2307/40000130. JSTOR 40000130.
- Vitchak, K. T. (1999). "Скифский язык: опыт описания" [The Scythian Language: Attempt at Description]. Вопросы языкознания. 5: 50–59.

Idanthyrsus Spargapeithes's dynasty
Regnal titles
Preceded by Saulius	King of the Scythians c. 513 BCE	Succeeded by Ariapeithes (?)
