= Madyes's Western Asian campaign =

Military expedition led by the Scythian king Madyes

- Map of the Scythian campaigns in the Near East under Madyes (based on Herodotus)
Date	c. 650s–620s BCE (disputed; see Chronological problems)
Location	Media, Assyria, Syria, Palestine
Result	Scythian victory: Scythians establish hegemony over the Median kingdom and parts of Western Asia; Egyptian advance halted; Psamtik I preserves Egyptian independence
Territorial changes	Scythian hegemony established over the Median kingdom and parts of Western Asia (up to Syria and Palestine)

Belligerents
Scythian kingdom Neo-Assyrian Empire; Lydia	Median kingdom Cimmerians; Babylonia; Urartu; Ancient Egypt

Commanders and leaders
Madyes	Phraortes †; Cyaxares (surrendered); Lygdamis †; Psamtik I

Strength
Unknown	Unknown

Casualties and losses
Minimal	Heavy

Madyes's Western Asian campaign (c. 650s–620s BCE) was a military expedition led by the Scythian king Madyes, son of Protothyes (Bartatua in Assyrian sources), during which the Scythians intervened in the conflicts between the Neo-Assyrian Empire, Media, and Babylonia, and established a brief period of Scythian hegemony over parts of Western Asia.

== Historical context ==
Madyes succeeded his father Bartatua as king of the Scythians. Bartatua had entered into an alliance with the Neo-Assyrian Empire, likely sealed by a marriage to an Assyrian princess. Under this arrangement, the Scythians remained allies of Assyria during the reigns of both Bartatua and Madyes.

== Course of the campaign ==
According to Herodotus, the Median king Cyaxares marched against the Assyrian capital of Nineveh. While he was besieging the city, a great army of Scythians came down upon him, led by Madyes, son of Protothyes. The Medes fought a battle against the Scythians and were defeated, losing not only the victory but also the empire of Asia.

The Scythians then obtained the sovereignty of Asia and advanced towards Egypt. When they reached Syria and Palestine, the Egyptian king Psammetichus came to meet them and, through gifts and entreaties, persuaded them not to advance further.

== Character of Scythian rule ==
Herodotus reports that for twenty-eight years the Scythians were masters of Asia, which their outrages and violence threw into confusion. In addition to the regular tribute they imposed, they exacted from each whatever they chose, and they ravaged the country in their continual raids.

== End of Scythian hegemony ==
Eventually Cyaxares and the Medes invited the greater part of the Scythians to a feast and slaughtered them while they were drunk. In this way the Medes regained the empire they had previously held. They then captured Nineveh and made themselves masters of Assyria, with the exception of Babylonia.

== Chronological problems ==
The date of Madyes's invasion remains disputed. Traditional datings place it in the 650s or 620s BCE. However, the chronology of Herodotus's account is problematic, as he appears to have conflated events separated by a considerable span of time. Some scholars have proposed dating the Scythian invasion to a later period, arguing that the twenty-eight years of Scythian rule extended from twenty-two years before to six years after the fall of Nineveh. The Assyrian records themselves do not contain direct references to a "Scythian rule over Asia," which creates difficulties for precise dating.

== Historical significance ==
Madyes' campaign represents one of the most extensive episodes of Scythian penetration into Western Asia. Although the period of Scythian hegemony was relatively brief, the invasion disrupted the balance of power in the region, temporarily weakened Media, and delayed the final Assyrian collapse. The reliability of Herodotus's account of the details of this campaign remains a subject of scholarly debate, as it finds no direct confirmation in synchronous cuneiform sources.
