= Takhtisdziri Achaemenid seal =

Excavated 1996 in Kareli Municipality, Georgia

Takhtisdziri Achaemenid seal refers to an Achaemenid seal which was excavated by I. Gagoshidze in 1996 in the village of Takhtisdziri in Shida Kartli, Kareli Municipality in Georgia. It is a conical dark sky-blue (approaching violet) seal made out of chalcedony. The seal, which has a outward swelling surface, depicts a Tree of Life in addition to a pair of wild goats on both sides of the tree. A four-petalled flower is depicted at each branch of the tree. It dates to the earlier half of the 5th century BC. According to Ketevan Dzhavakhishvili in Ancient Civilizations from Scythia to Siberia, the seal, on the whole, is a genuine masterpiece. The seal belongs to the "Oriental Royal Stye" as defined by John Boardman, which represents cylinder and conical seals predominantly influenced by Assyrian and Babylonian elements.
