= Sakez =

- in Persian: ساکز
- Scyth(Eskit)
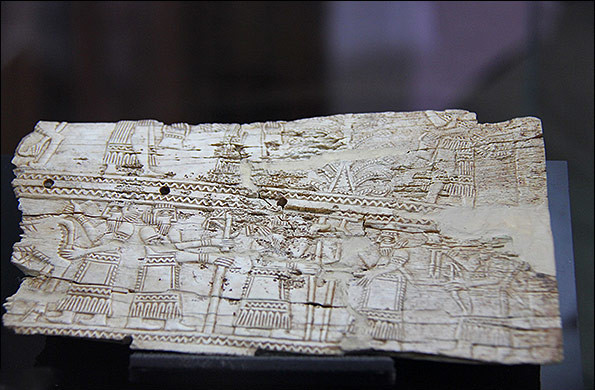
- Scythians on a historical piece found in Ziwiye

- Location within Iran
- 36°14′40″N 46°15′15″E
- Type: Settlement
- Cultures: Iranian (Scythians and Medes era)
- Location: Saqqez, Kurdistan Province, Iran

History
- Built: 700 BC
- Built by: Scythians

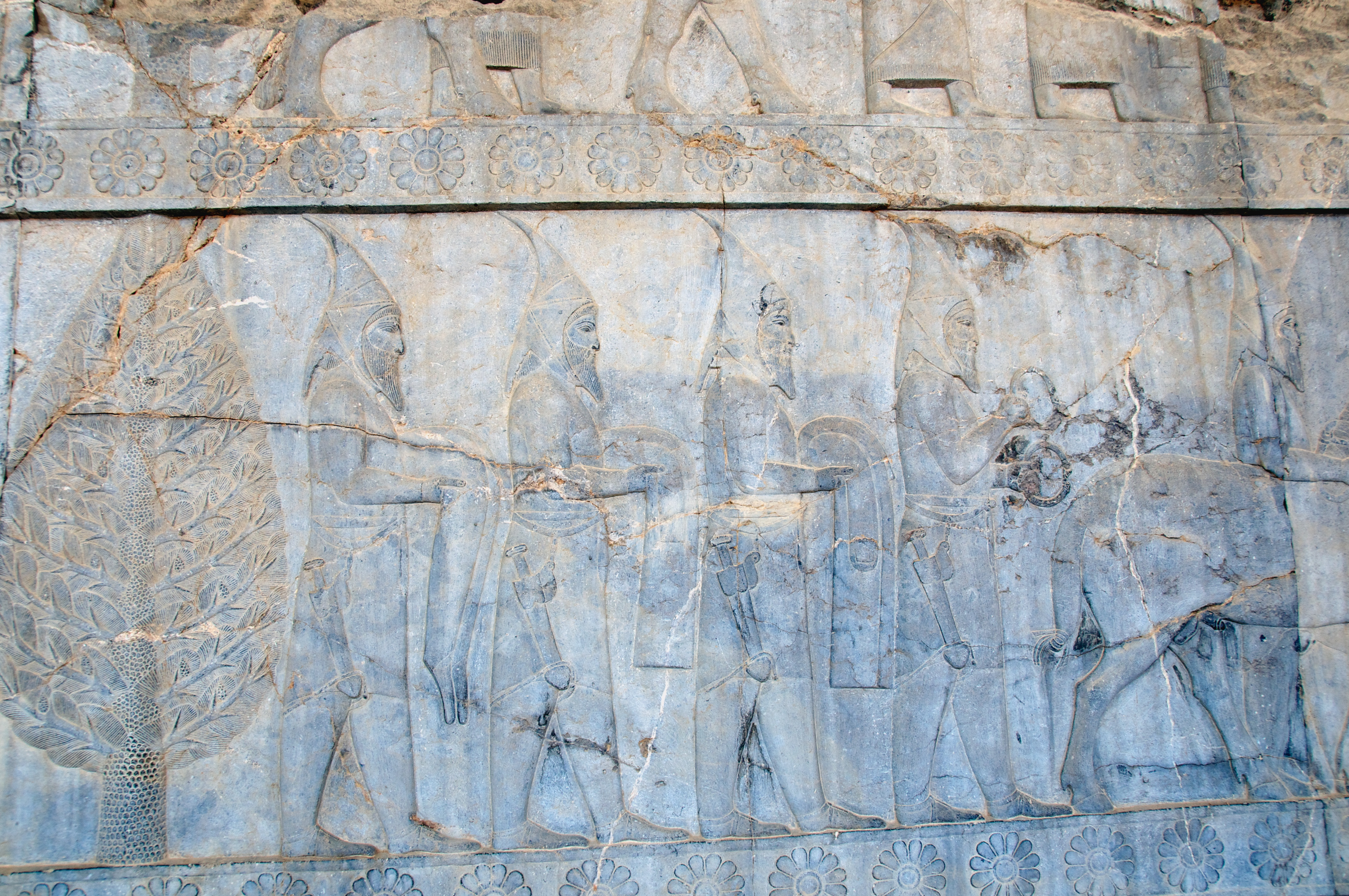
According to Donald N. Wilber's book Persepolis, The Archaeology of Parsa, Seat of the Persian Kings, the group depicted in this panel is "the Saka tigrakhauda (Pointed-hat Scythians). All are armed and wear the appropriate headgear.

Sakez (Persian: ساکز: Sakez) also known as Sekez, Sekakez and Scyth (Eskit) was a sizable urban settlement and historical ancient city in the first millennium BC in Iran. It was the political and military capital of Scythians in western Iran and one of the few ancient cities that has been the residence of people and the center of civilization and it still is. Archaeologists believe that the present-day city of Saqqez in Kurdistan is the remnant of the city of Sakez, which takes its name from the Scythians and, with a slight change in pronunciation, is still called by the same name.

== History ==
Scythians, also called Scyth, Saka, and Sacae, member of a nomadic people, originally of Iranian stock, known from as early as the 9th century BC who migrated westward from Central Asia to southern Russia and Ukraine in the 8th and 7th centuries BC. They were living primarily in the region known as Scythia. Assyrian inscriptions from 700 to 750 BC mention the Scythians. Due to migration, these people settled in large parts of the Central Asian plateau, east and west of the Caspian Sea and the Iranian plateau and were divided into different sects and groups. They were ethnic warriors and attacked the borders of the Medes and other regional governments. Among the earliest peoples to master mounted warfare, the Scythians replaced the Cimmerians as the dominant power on the Pontic steppe in the 8th century BC. The Scythians have migrated to Iran many times. In one of them he invaded the Medes and They ruled it for 27 years, and after taking over the kingdom from the Medes, they helped him to destroy the kingdom of Assyria. In Iran plateau and at the time of Medes emperor, when they ruled the western and Northwestern parts of Iran, they went to war with the Scythians several times. Cyaxares, the greatest king of Medes, first defeated the Scythians, who had conquered Media after the death of his father Phraortes. But in the first ten years of his reign, he succeeded in turning his relationship with the Scythian king, Protothis, into an alliance, and in practice the Scythians became part of the Medes. In the time of Cyaxares, after the subjugation of the Scythians in Media, a group of Scythians migrated to the west of the land of Media and this land was called Sakez or Sakzi. Also, during the Parthian dynasty, Arskanian, the Daheh dynasty of Scythians ruled Iran for nearly five hundred years. In ancient times, they migrated to the south of present-day Afghanistan and Iran, and in the Zaranj or Darangianeh region, they were replaced to some extent equal to Helmand province in present-day Afghanistan, Zabul and Kerman, and their territory was from Herat to Zaranj (Zarang) and part of It encompassed Iran and Afghanistan, and that land was called Sakistan (modern-day Sistan).

== Excavations and research ==
Many historical monuments, fragments and antiques and castle hills of Saqqez region have been discovered and recorded. From the relics of the Scythian era, like other civilizations, metal or pottery pieces have been found in the hills of ancient castles. Scythian art, also called steppe art, decorated objects, mainly arms, jewelry, and trappings for horses, tents, and wagons. One of the most important artifacts discovered is the Ziwiyeh Castle and the great Ziwiye hoard, which was discovered in the 1940s. In addition to Scythian artifacts, artifacts related to Mannaeans and Medes were also discovered, and archaeologists, such as Roman Ghirshman, concluded that the great site of Saqqez was the Capital of many of these civilizations. He writes:

During the occupation of Iran, the Scythians made Saqqez their capital in the region of Kurdistan, which is now, with a history of 3,000 years, one of the oldest cities in the world. As traces of them have been found in the area and it is said that the word "Saqqez" is a derivative of the name "Saka" which is the Persian name of Scythian.

== Gallery ==
A collection of Scythian antiquities in Iran:

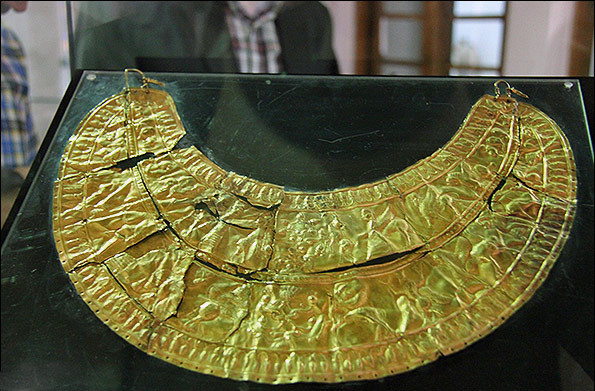
Gold necklaces in Zewiye hoard

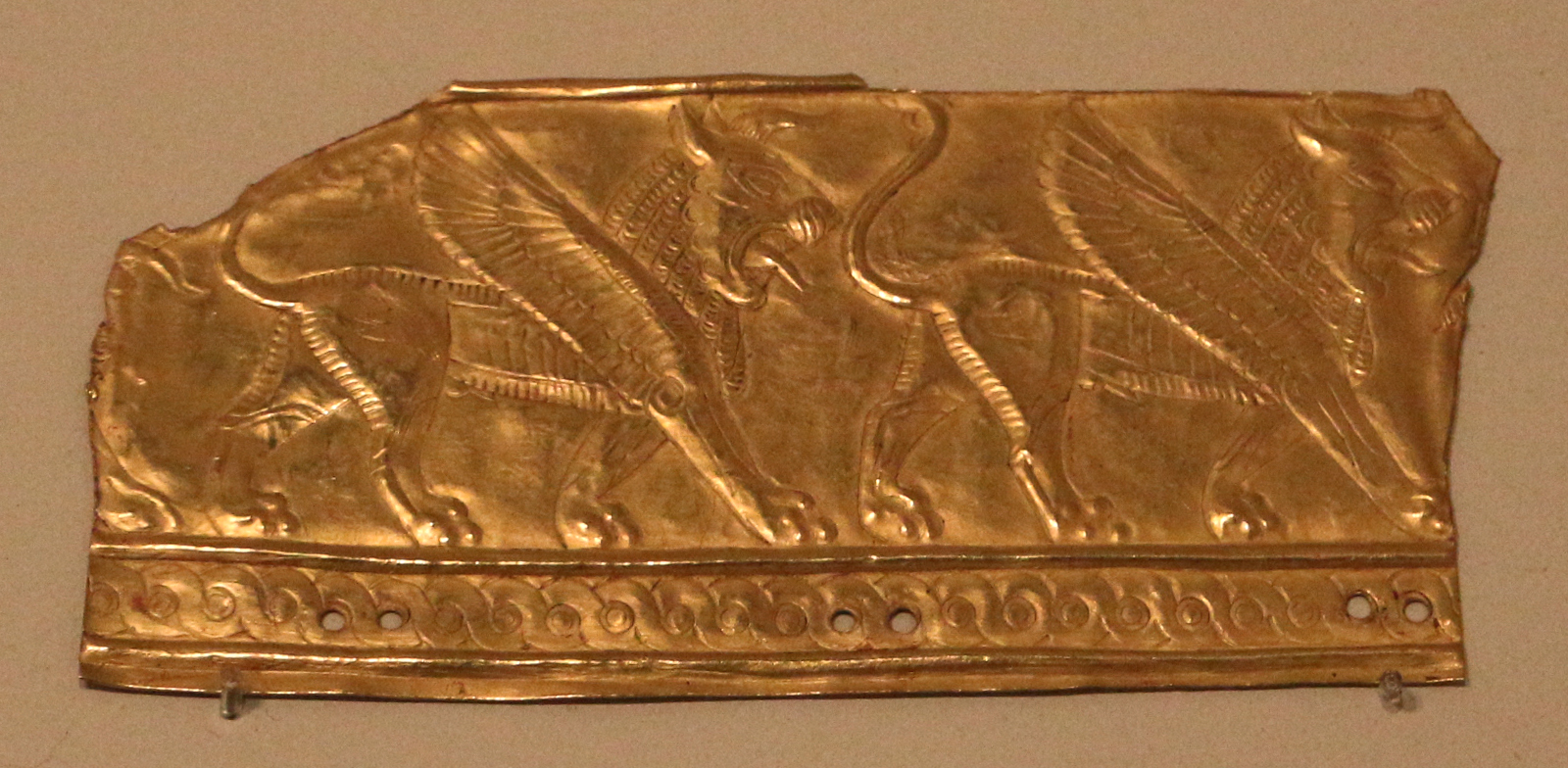
A golden plaque

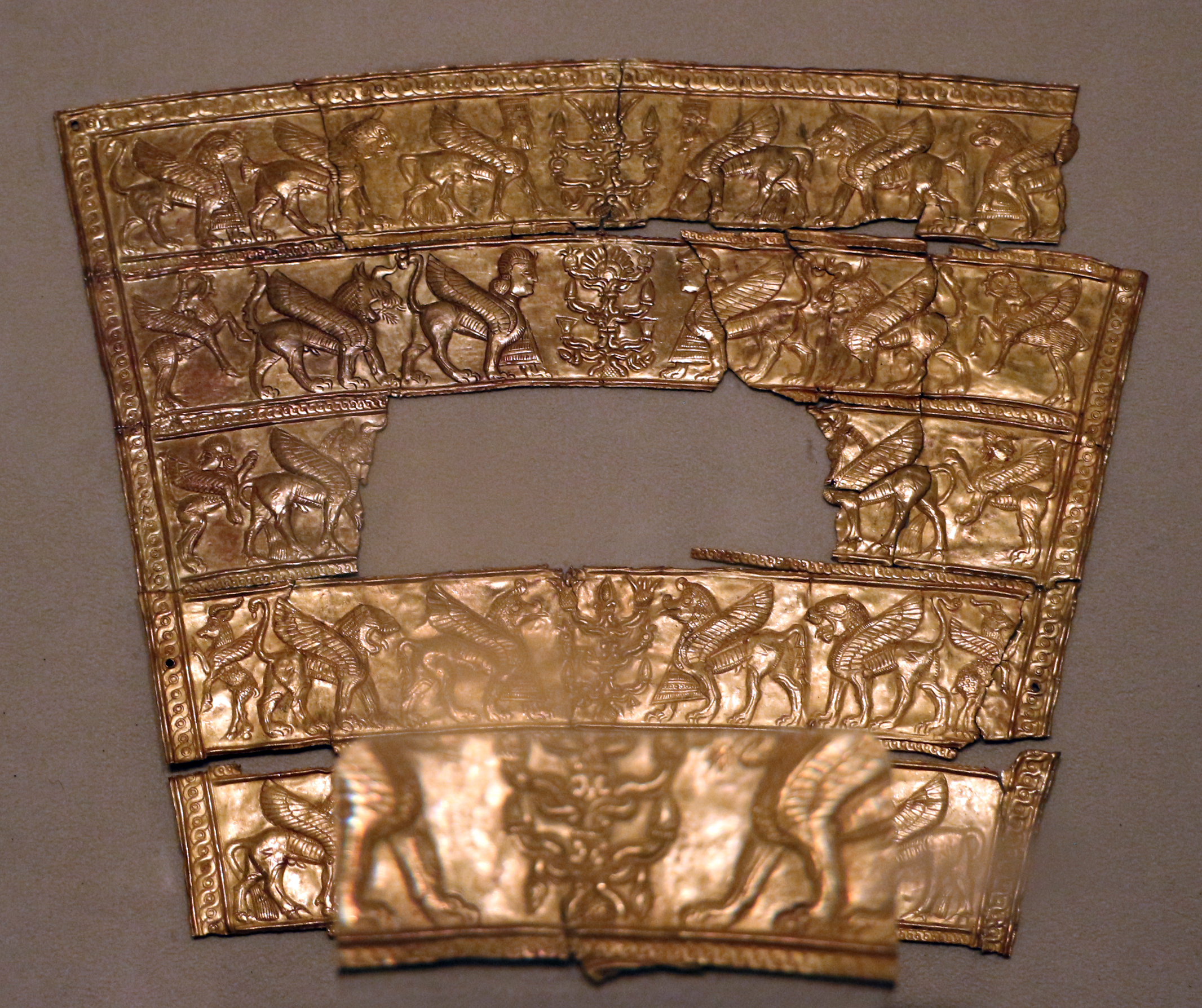
A golden plaque

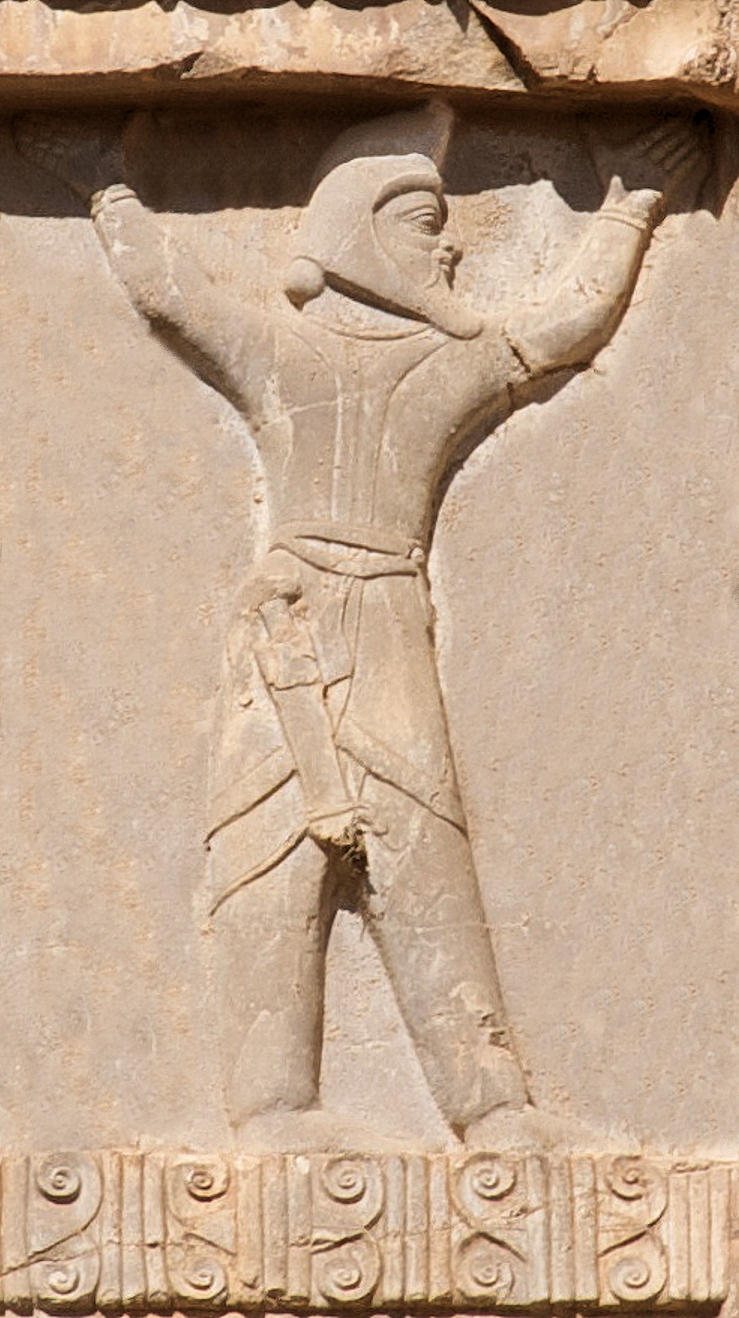
Xerxes detail Scythian soldier of the Achaemenid army

== See also ==
- List of oldest continuously inhabited cities
- Assyrian homeland
- Medes
- Scythians
- Bartatua
- Mannaeans
