= Qyzqapan =

Ancient rock-cut tomb in Iraqi Kurdistan

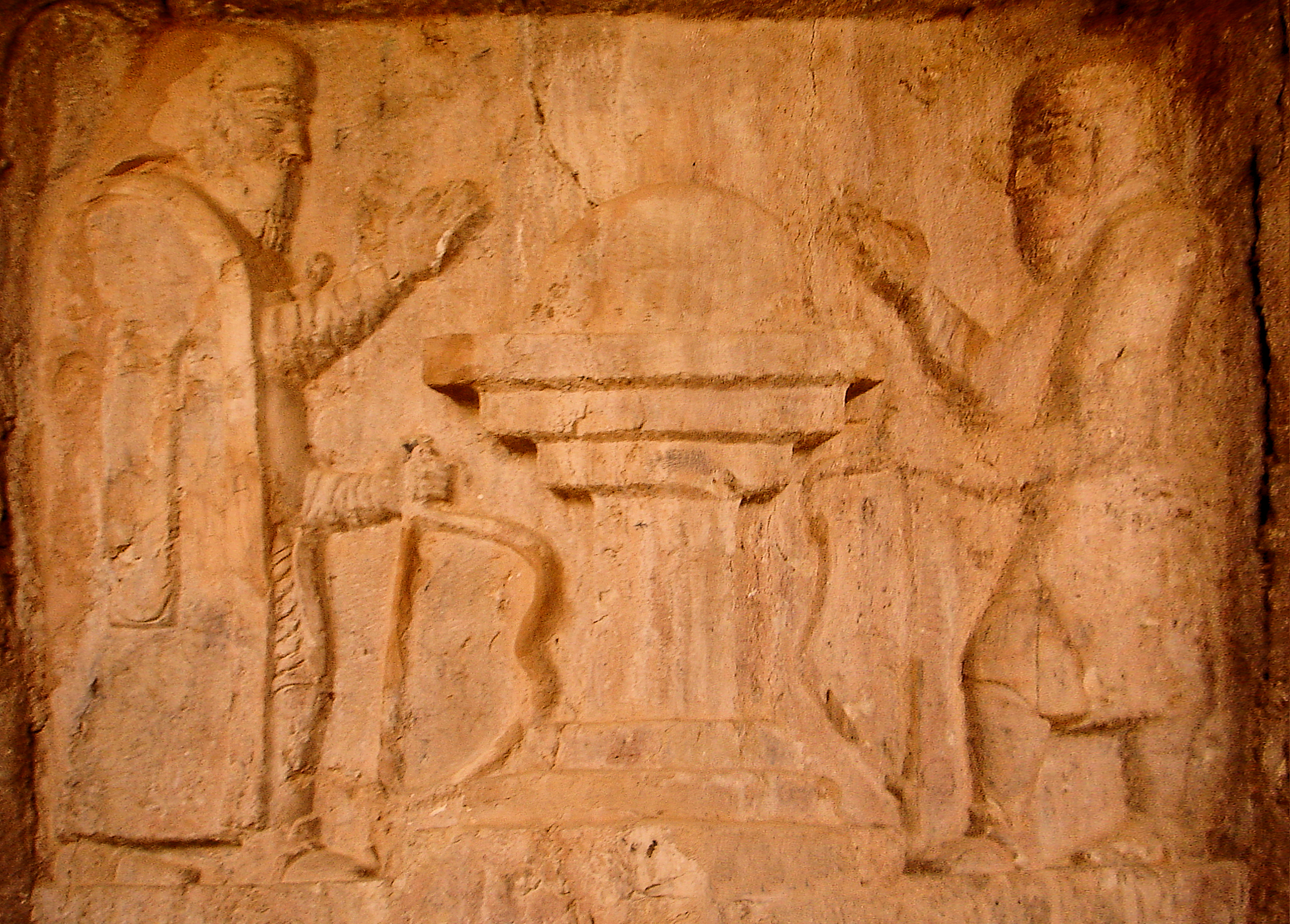
Tomb relief

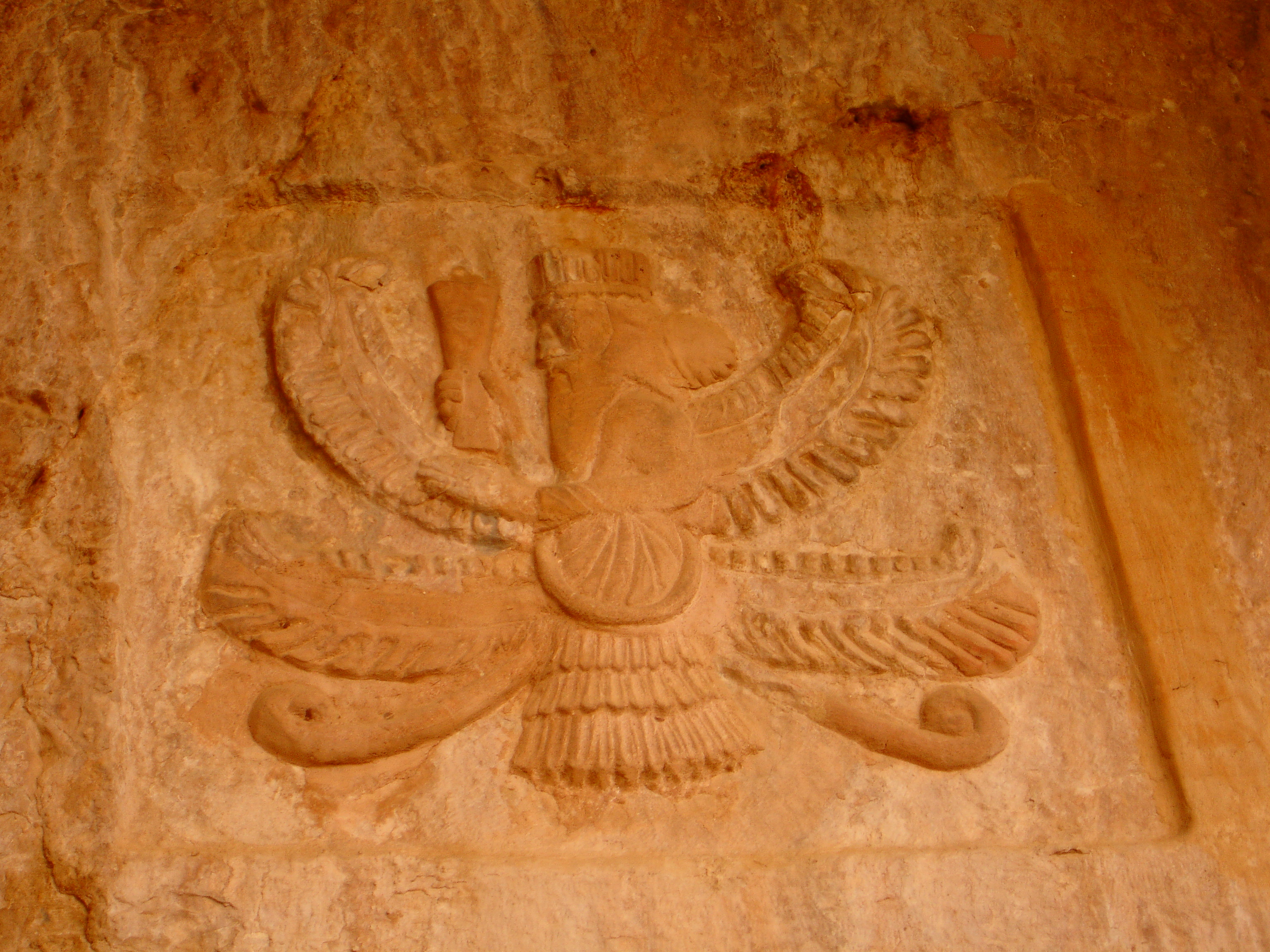
Tomb relief

The rock-cut tombs of Qyzqapan or Qizqapan (Kurdish: ئه‌شكه‌وتی قزقاپان, romanized: Ashkawt-i Qizqapan), is a rock-cut tomb lying near the Palaeolithic cave of Zarzi in Iraqi Kurdistan.

== Story ==
Ashkawt means cave in Sorani Kurdish. The cave is also known as the cave of the abducted girl (Kurdish: ئەشكەوتی كچه دزراوەكه).

== History ==
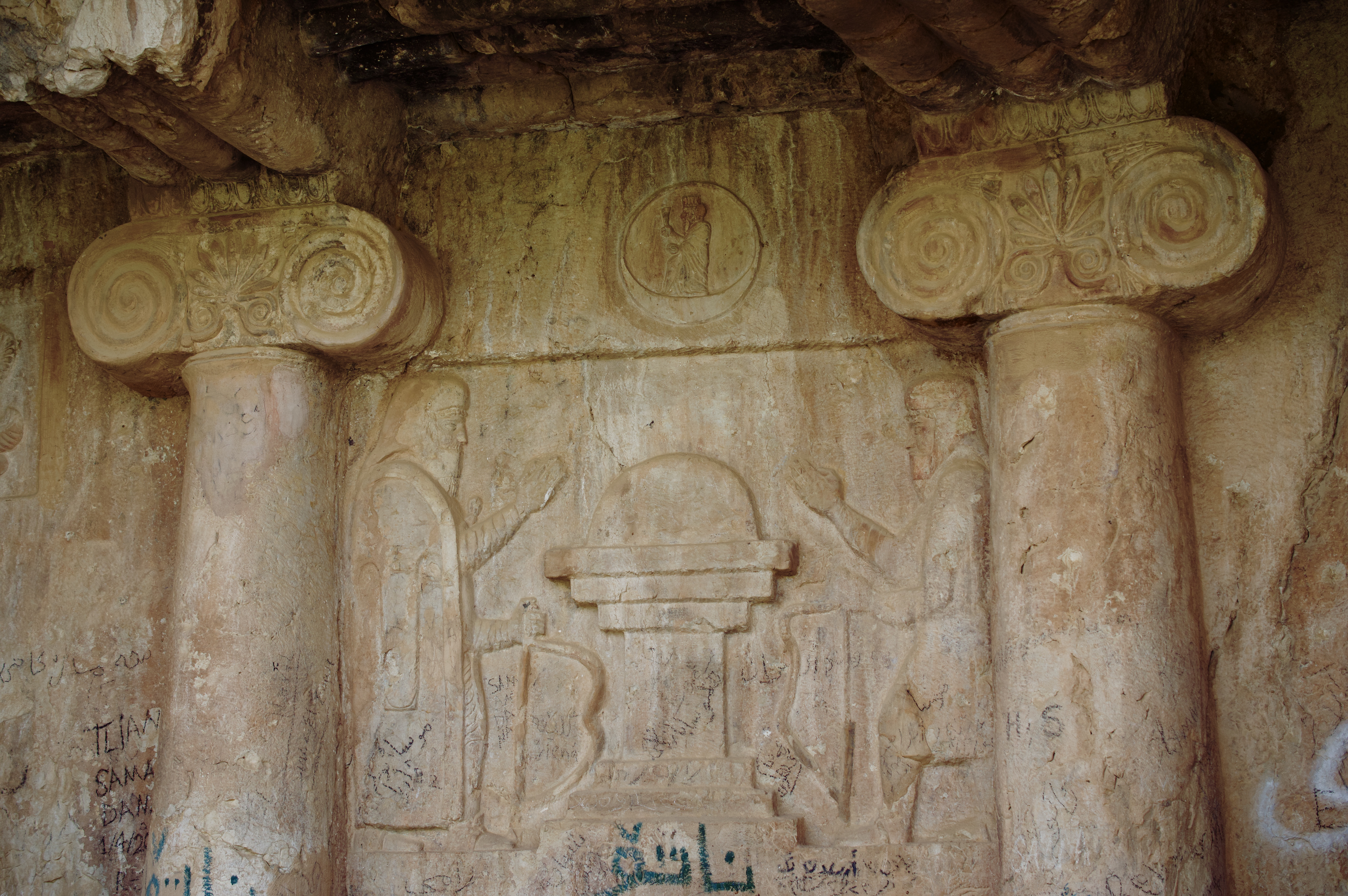
Two Columns on top of the gate to the tomb

The rock-cut tomb has three burial chambers, each with a hewn grave in the left corner, all accessible from the central chamber. The entrance into the tomb lies approximately 8 meters above the ground level.

Different dates from the Medes, Achaemenid, Seleucid, and Parthian periods have been proposed for the construction of the tomb. The general belief of scientists is that the tomb was built by the Medes people.

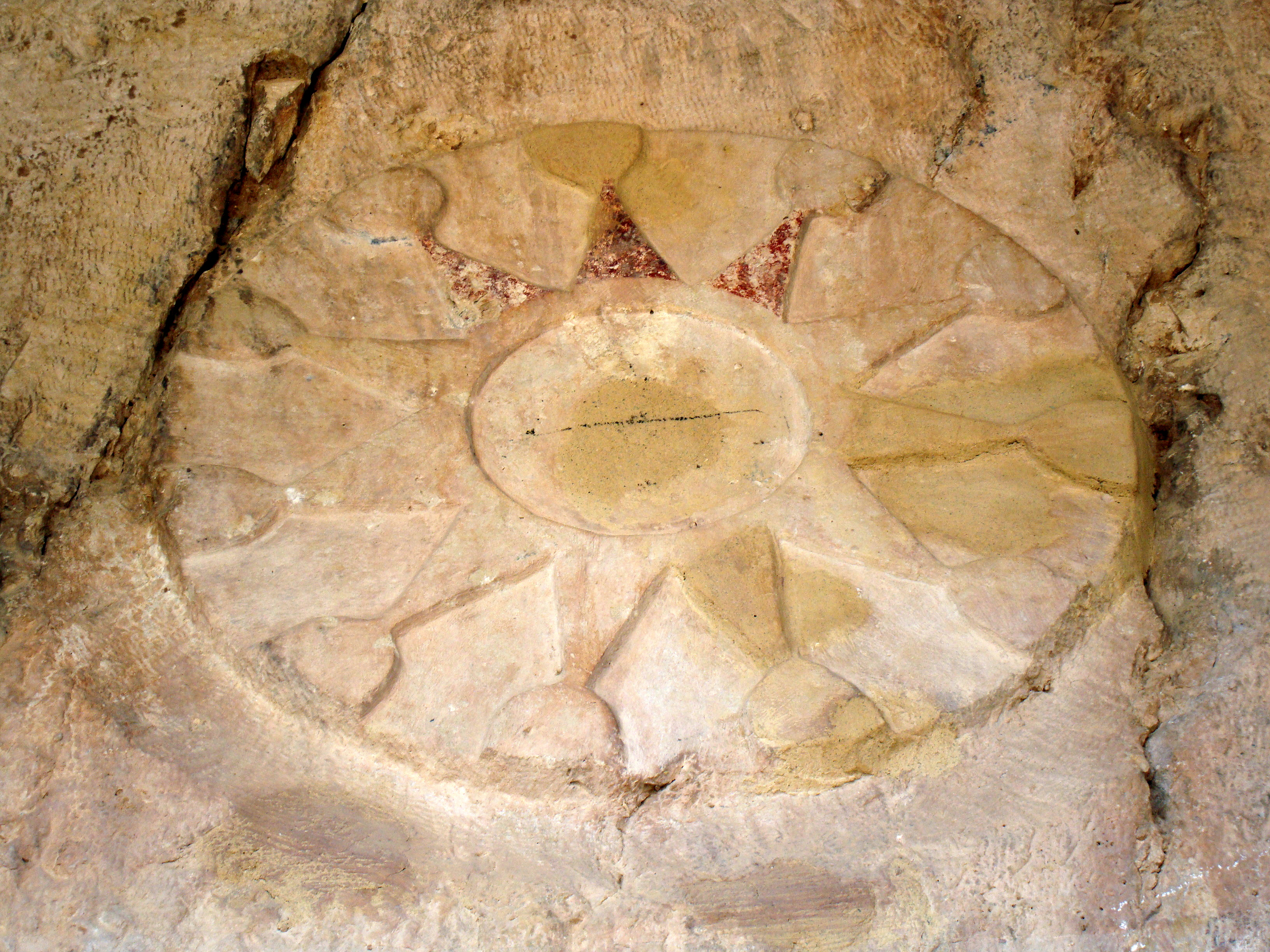
Sun/Divine emblem on top of the gate to the Tomb

The symbols of the tomb refers to Mithraism, with Mithra being the supreme deity of Medes. Some scholars such as Igor Diakonov believe that the tomb was built for the Median ruler Huvaxshatra or Cyaxares. if the Qyzqapan tomb is a royal one (which is very likely) the warrior is none other than Cyaxares.
