= Ancient Civilizations from Scythia to Siberia =

Peer-reviewed academic journal

- Discipline: History and archaeology
- Language: English
- Edited by: Askold Ivantchik

Publication details
- History: 1995–present
- Publisher: Brill Publishers
- Frequency: Bimonthly

Standard abbreviations
- ISO 4: Anc. Civiliz. Scythia Sib.

Indexing
- ISSN: 0929-077X (print); 1570-0577 (web)

Links
- Journal homepage

Ancient Civilizations from Scythia to Siberia is a peer-reviewed academic journal on the ancient and medieval history and archaeology of the former Soviet Union. The editor-in-chief is Askold Ivantchik. The journal is published by Brill and indexed in Academic Search Complete and Scopus.
