= Ḫubuškia =

Iron Age kingdom

Hubushkia was an Iron Age kingdom located between the Urartian and Assyrian sphere of influence.

The exact location of Hubushkia is unknown. The kingdom appears in the Assyrian annals of the tenth and ninth centuries BC, which record the names of some kings of Hubushkia, such as Kaki and Data or Dadi. The Assyrian references primarily record the relations between the Assyrian Empire and Hubushkia towards the end of the ninth century. Assyrian expeditions crossed Hubushkia several times, receiving tribute from its kings, or taking it by force when they resisted. Disputed by Assyria and the kingdom of Urartu, Hubushkia eventually lost its independence. A position between these contending forces suggests to some scholars that the kingdom of Hubushkia was centred on the headwaters of the Great Zap River, in what is now Hakkâri Province in Eastern Anatolia, Turkey.
