= Gocha R. Tsetskhladze =

Georgian archaeologist (c. 1963 – 2022)

Gocha R. Tsetskhladze (12 December 1962 – 11 September 2022) was a Georgian-born British classical archaeologist who studied in Ukraine, Russia and England, at the University of Oxford. He taught at Royal Holloway, University of London and Melbourne University. Tsetskhladze became director of the central Anatolian Pessinus excavation site in 2009. His area of specialisation was Greek colonization. He previously worked on excavations of Greek colonies located along the Black Sea coasts of Georgia, Russia, and Ukraine.

Tsetskhladze died on 11 September 2022, at the age of 59.

The English charity organisation Friends of Academic Research in Georgia (FaRiG) has a Graeco-Roman Period Small Grant in the memory of Gocha Tsetskhaldze's brother, Gogita Tsetskhladze (1975 – 1984).

== Bibliography ==
=== Articles ===
- On the Name Kolkh in the Ancient World (with D. C. Braund), Bulletin of the Academy of Sciences of the Georgian SSR 136.2, 1989, 497–499 (in Russian)
- The Export of Slaves from Colchis (with D. C. Braund), The Classical Quarterly. 39 (1), 1989
- Zu den kolchischen Sklaven in der griechischen Welt, Klio 72.1, 1990, 151–159 (in German)
- Colchis and Greek Culture: A Problem of Hellenization. Mesopotamia 26, 1991, 119–139
- Colchis and the Persian Empire: the Problems of their Relationship. Silk Road Art and Archaeology 3, 1992a
- Greek Colonization of the Eastern Black Sea Littoral (Colchis). Dialogues d'Histoire ancienne 18.2, 1992b, 233–258
- The Cult of Mithras in Ancient Colchis, Revue de l'histoire des religions, Vol. 209, No. 2, AVRIL - JUIN 1992c, 115–124
- The Interpretation of Pichvnari. Dialogues d'Histoire ancienne 19.2, 1993
- The Silver Phiale Mesomphalos from the Kuban (Northern Caucasus), Oxford Journal of Archaeology, Vol. 13/2, 1994, 199–215
- Did the Greeks go to Colchis for Metals?, Oxford Journal of Archaeology, Vol. 14/3, 1995, 307–331
- Who Built the Scythian and Thracian Royal and Elite Tombs?, Oxford Journal of Archaeology, Vol. 17/1, 1998, 55–92.
- New Publications. Georgia, Ancient West and East, 2/1, 2003.
- Ancient West and East: Mtskheta, Capital of Caucasian Iberia, Mediterranean Archaeology, Vol. 19/20, 2006.
