= Cyaxares =

King of the Medes from 625 to 585 BC

- King of Media
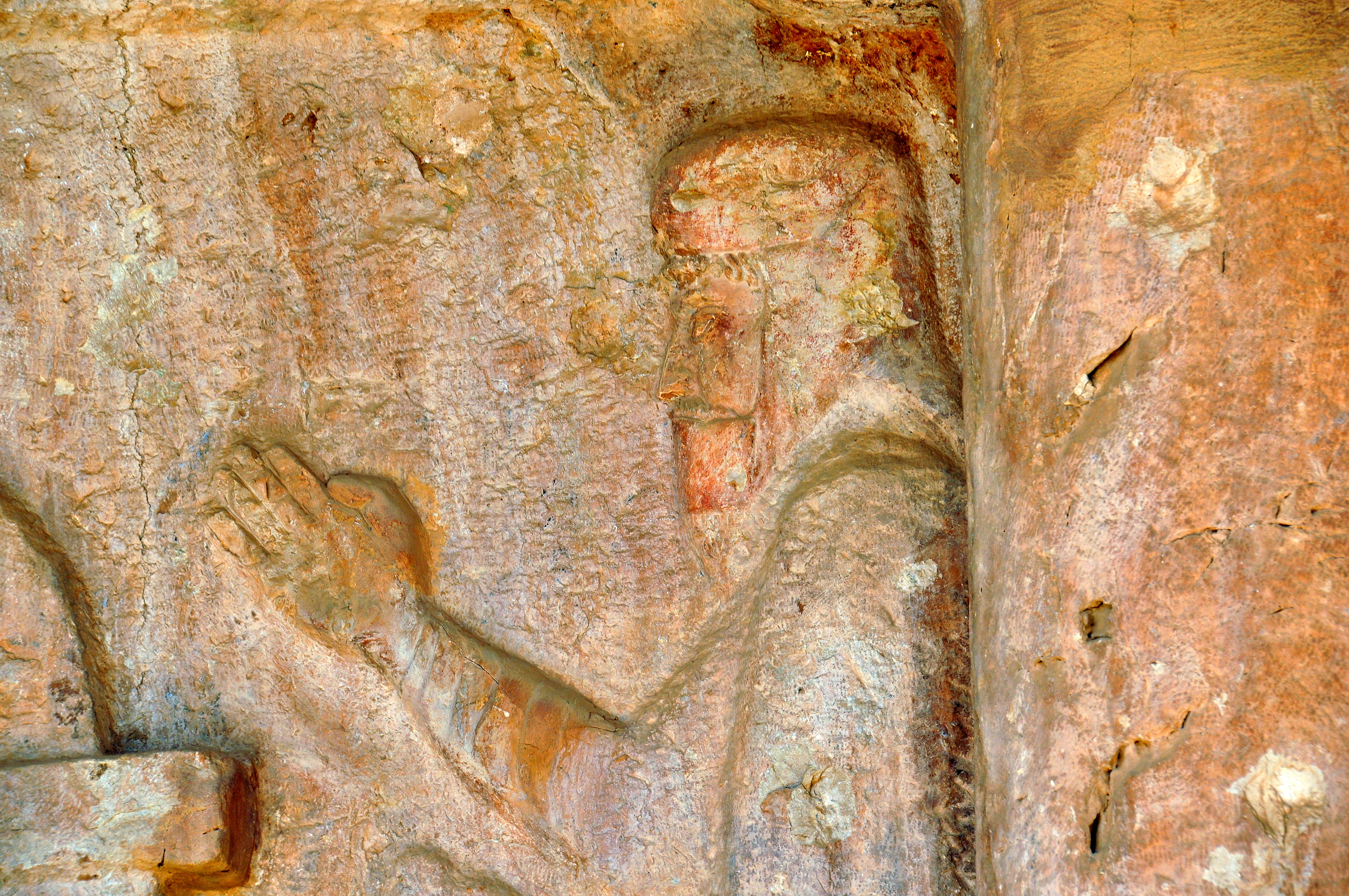
- Possible relief of Cyaxares, Qyzqapan tomb, Sulaymaniyah. Iraqi Kurdistan.

King of the Medes
- Reign: 625 – 585 BC
- Coronation: 625 BC
- Predecessor: Phraortes
- Successor: Astyages
- Born: 675 BC; Ecbatana
- Died: 585 BC
- Burial: Syromedia (present-day Qyzqapan, Kurdistan Region)
- Spouse: Daughter (or granddaughter) of Nabopolassar
- Issue: Astyages; Amytis
- Median: ᴴuvaxšϑra
- Dynasty: Median
- Father: Phraortes
- Religion: Ancient Iranian religion

Cyaxares (Note: /saɪˈæksərˌiz/ sai-ACK-sir-eez; Median: ᴴuvaxšϑra; Old Persian: 𐎢𐎺𐎧𐏁𐎫𐎼, romanized: ᴴuvaxštra; Late Babylonian Akkadian: 𒁹𒌑𒀝𒊓𒋫𒅈, romanized: Waksatar; Old Phrygian: Ksuwaksaros; Ancient Greek: Κυαξάρης, romanized: Kuaxarēs; Latin: Cyaxarēs) was the third king of the Medes. He ascended to the throne in 625 BC, after his father Phraortes lost his life in a battle against the Assyrians, probably Ashurbanipal. Assyrian allies, the Scythians then ruled Media for 28 years before Cyaxeres overthrew Scythian domination and became king.

Cyaxares collaborated with the Babylonians to destroy the Assyrian Empire, and united most of the Iranian peoples of ancient Iran, thereby transforming Media into a major power.

== Name ==
The name Cyaxares is the Latinised form of the Greek Kuaxárēs (Κυαξάρης), which was itself the Hellenisation of the Median name ᴴuvaxšϑra (𐎢𐎺𐎧𐏁𐎫𐎼), meaning "good ruler."

The Greek author Diodorus Siculus named Cyaxares as Astibaras (Αστιβαρας), which is the Hellenisation of the Median name *R̥štibarah, meaning "spear bearer." This name is similar to the Median form of his son Astyages's name, *R̥štivaigah, meaning "spear thrower."

== Life and reign ==
=== Scythian rule ===
According to Herodotus, Cyaxares was the son of the Median king Phraortes. In the middle of the 7th century BCE, Phraortes led the Medes in a revolt against Assyria and was killed in battle, either against the Assyrians under their king Ashurbanipal, or against the Assyrians' Scythian allies, whose king Madyes invaded the Medes and imposed Scythian hegemony over them for almost three decades years on behalf of the Assyrians, thus starting a period which Herodotus called the "Scythian rule over Asia".

Following the Scythian invasion, Cyaxares succeeded his father Phraortes as king of the Medes under the suzerainty of the Scythians.

By the 620s BCE, the Assyrian Empire began to weaken after the death of Ashurbanipal: in addition to internal instability within Assyria itself, Babylon revolted against the Assyrians in 626 BCE. The next year, in 625 BCE, Cyaxares overthrew the Scythian yoke over the Medes by inviting the Scythian rulers to a banquet, getting them drunk, and then murdering them all, including possibly Madyes himself.

After freeing the Medes from the Scythian yoke, Cyaxares reorganised the Median armed forces in preparation for a war with Assyria: whereas the Medes previously fought as tribal militias divided into kinship groups and each warrior used whatever weapons they were the most skilled at, Cyaxares instituted a regular army modelled on the Assyrian and Urartian armies, fully equipped by the state and divided into strategic and tactical units. Cyaxares might also have forced the Scythians into an alliance with the Medes after overthrowing their rule, since from 615 BCE onwards the Babylonian records mention the Scythians as the allies of the Medes.

=== War in Parthia ===
At some point during his reign, Cyaxares conquered the countries of Hyrcania and Parthia, which were located to the immediate east of Media.

According to Diodorus Siculus, at one point the Parthians revolted against Cyaxares and entrusted their country and their capital city to the Sacae or the Dahae, after which a war broke out between the Medes and the Saka, led by their queen Zarinaia, who founded multiple cities. According to Diodorus, Zarinaia was the sister of the Saka king Cydraeus and initially his wife, but after his death she married the Parthian king Marmares. During the war against the Medes, Zarinaia was wounded in battle and captured by Cyaxares's son-in-law Stryngaeus, who listened to her pleas and spared her life; when Marmares later captured Stryngaeus, Zarinaia killed Marmares, and rescued Stryngaeus. At the end of this war, the Parthians accepted Median rule, and peace was made between the Medes and the Saka.

Diodorus's account suggests that the region of Parthia was influenced by both the Medes to their west, and by the Saka nomads of the region of the Caspian and Aral Seas.

=== War against Assyria ===
Following the defeat of a joint Assyrian-Mannaean force at Gablinu by the new Babylonian rebel king and founder of the Neo-Babylonian Empire, Nabopolassar, the next year Cyaxares conquered Mannae, which brought the Median armies to the frontiers of Assyria. In November 615 BCE, six months after Nabopolassar had failed to seize the important Assyrian centre of Assur, Cyaxares crossed the Zagros mountains and occupied the city of Arrapḫa. The next year, in July and August of 614 BCE, the Median armies performed a distractive manoeuvre by ostensibly marching on the Assyrian capital of Nineveh, which prompted the Assyrian king Sinsharishkun to go defend the city, after which the Medes marched north along the Tigris and seized Tarbiṣu, following which they crossed the river and marched down its right bank to Assur, and thereby cut the Assyrian centres of Nineveh and Kalhu from outside help. Then the Median forces attacked and conquered Assur, during which the Medes' forces massacred the city's inhabitants, destroyed its temples, and seized its treasures.

Shortly after the fall of Assur, the Babylonian king Nabopolassar met Cyaxares at the ruins of the city, and they concluded an alliance against Assyria which was sealed by diplomatic marriages, with Nabopolassar's son Nebuchadnezzar II marrying Cyaxares's daughter Amytis, and Cyaxares marrying a daughter or granddaughter of Nabopolassar.

Once the alliance between Cyaxares and Nabopolassar had been concluded, the Median and Babylonian forces acted in concert with each other in the war against Assyria. In 612 BCE, the Median and Babylonian armies together crossed the ʿAdhaim river at its mouth and marched on the Assyrian capital city, Nineveh, which was taken and sacked by the joint Medo-Babylonian forces after three months of siege. The Assyrian king Sinsharishkun likely died during the fall of Nineveh.

After the death of Sinsharishkun, an Assyrian leader who might have been his son, Ashur-uballit II, proclaimed himself the new Assyrian king in Harran, where he ruled with the support of the remnant of the Assyrian army. In 610 BCE, the pro-Assyrian Egyptian pharaoh Necho II intervened in the Levant in support of the Assyrians, and went to Harran to support Ashur-uballit. In 610 BCE, Cyaxares and Nabopolassar seized Harran from the Assyro-Egyptian force, which retreated to Carchemish on the west bank of the Euphrates.

According to older interpretations of the destruction of the Neo-Assyrian Empire, its territory was partitioned between the Babylonians and the Medes, the latter of whom obtained a territory which included Assyria proper and had a southern border which started at Carchemish and passed south of Harran and along the Jabal Sinjār till the Tigris to the south of Assur, and then along the Jabāl Hamrīn and across the Diyala River valley until the northwestern borders of Elam. However, according to more recent research, the Neo-Babylonian Empire obtained all of the former territories of the Assyrian Empire except for those on the Zagros mountains which the Assyrians had already lost to the Medes in earlier times, and the role of the Medes in the war against the Assyrians was largely to act as the main fighting force which handed over territory to the Babylonians and returned to Media once these military activities were completed.

=== Conquest of Urartu ===
In 609 BCE, the Medes attacked the capital of the kingdom of Urartu in the Armenian Highlands. The attack on Urartu might have been carried out in alliance with the Babylonians, since Babylonian records mention a joint Medo-Babylonian attack on Bit Hanunia in Urartu in 608 BCE, and a splinter Scythian group likely joined the Medes and participated in their conquest of Urartu. This invasion did not result in the destruction of Urartu, but in it becoming a subject kingdom of the new Median state. Median contingents might have helped the final Babylonian victory against the joint Assyrian-Egyptian force at Carchemish in 605 BCE, at which point the Medes' military collaboration with the Babylonian campaigns ended, and Median forces did not participate in any of the consequent Babylonian campaigns in Syria and Palestine.

=== War against the Lydians ===
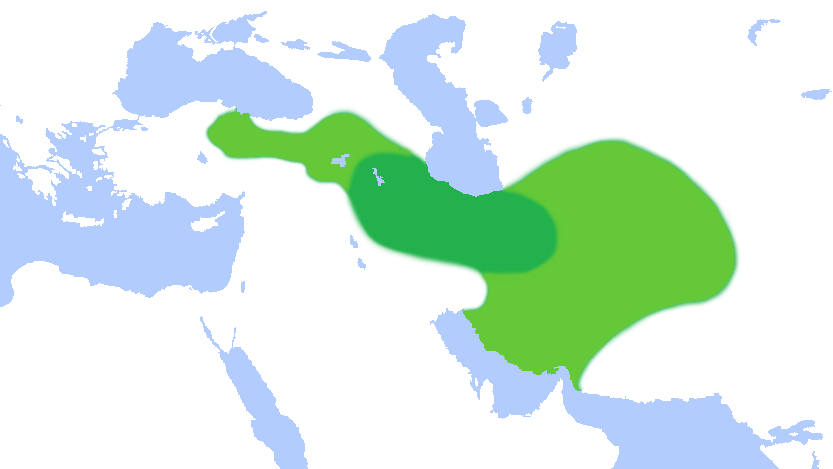
Cyaxares' Media at the time of its maximum expansion

Following the destruction of the Assyrian Empire, the majority of the Scythians were expelled from Western Asia and into the Pontic Steppe during the 600s BCE, and the relations between the Medes and the Babylonians soon temporarily deteriorated in the 590s. The deuterocanonical Book of Judith describes a battle in 593 BC. between King Nebuchadnezzar II and Arphaxad (thought to be another name for Cyaxares).

Later, a war broke out between Media and another group of Scythians, probably members of a splinter group who had formed a kingdom in what is now Azerbaijan. These Scythians left Median-ruled Transcaucasia and fled into the kingdom of Lydia, which had been allied to the Scythians. After the Lydian king Alyattes refused to accede to Cyaxares's demands that these Scythian refugees be handed to him, a war broke out between Media and the Lydian Empire in 590 BCE.

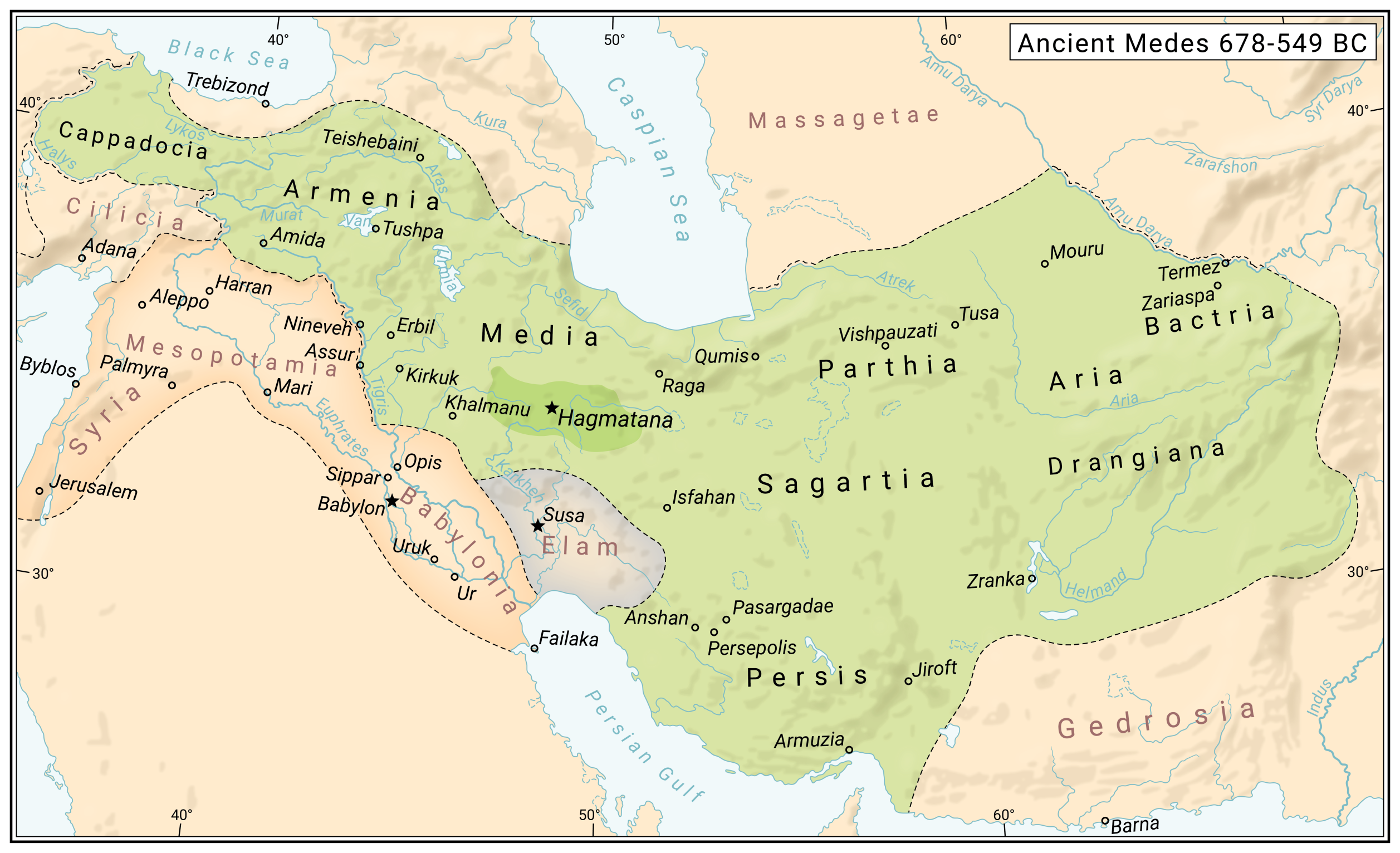
A map showing the ancient Median Empire around 550 BC at its maximum extent

This war lasted five years, until a solar eclipse known as the Eclipse of Thales occurred in 585 BCE, during which a battle was fought between the Lydian and Median armies. Hence, this battle became known as the Battle of the Eclipse. Both sides interpreted the eclipse as an omen to end the war. The kings of Babylon and Cilicia acted as mediators in the ensuing peace treaty, which was sealed by the marriage of Cyaxares's son Astyages with Alyattes's daughter Aryenis.

The border between Lydia and Media was fixed at a yet undetermined location in eastern Anatolia; the Graeco-Roman historians' traditional account of the Halys River as having been set as the border between the two kingdoms appears to have been a retroactive narrative construction based on symbolic role assigned by Greeks to the Halys as the separation between Lower Asia and Upper Asia as well as on the Halys being a later provincial border within the Achaemenid Empire.

=== Death ===
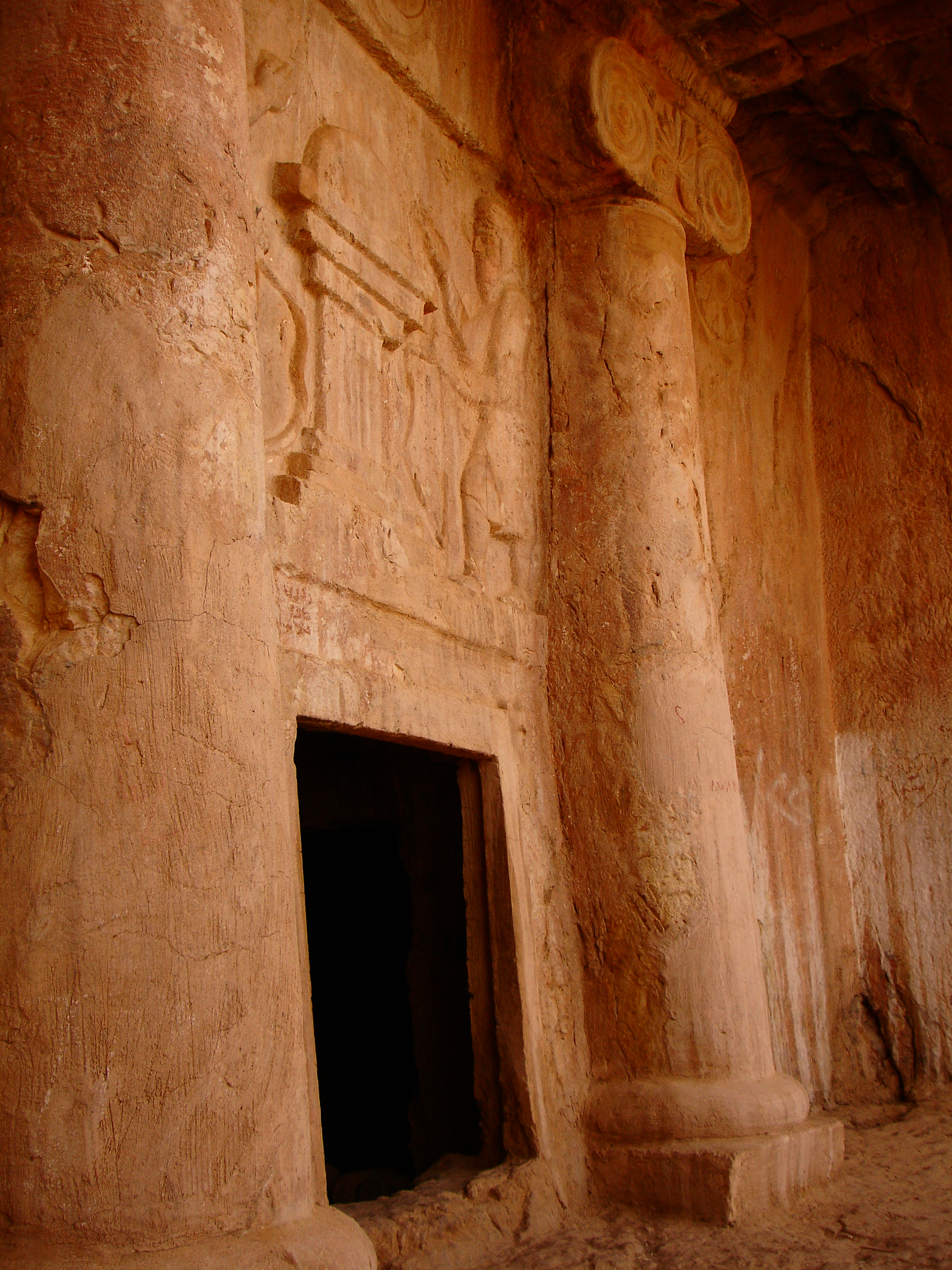
Possible Tomb of Cyaxares, Qyzqapan, Sulaymaniyah. Iraqi Kurdistan

Cyaxares died a short time after the Battle of the Eclipse in 585 BCE, and was succeeded by his son Astyages. The Russian historian Igor Diakonoff has tentatively suggested that the tomb of Cyaxares might be located at the place now called Qyzqapan, in the mountains of present-day Iraqi Kurdistan in Sulaymaniyah.

== Legacy ==
After Darius I seized power in the Achaemenid Empire, rebellions erupted claiming Cyaxares's legacy. After these were defeated, Darius noted two in the Behistun Inscription: "Another was Phraortes, the Mede; he lied, saying: 'I am Khshathrita, of the dynasty of Cyaxares.' He made Media to revolt. Another was Tritantaechmes, the Sagartian; he lied, saying: 'I am king in Sagartia, of the dynasty of Cyaxares.' He made Sagartia to revolt."

One of the options that has sparked deep debate regarding the reign of Cyaxares is Zoroastrianism. The question of when the prophet Zoroaster lived and to which years the Avesta belongs still awaits an empirical answer. Cyaxares is referenced in the Kurdish national anthem Ey Reqîb, written in 1938 by poet Dildar. In the lyrics, he is named as "Kayxusraw", (Note: Kurdish: کەیخوسرەو, romanized: Keyxûsirew) as a symbol of ancient Kurdish power and resistance.

== Sources ==
- Diakonoff, I. M. (1993). "CYAXARES". Encyclopaedia Iranica.
- Diakonoff, I. M. (1985). "Media". In Gershevitch, Ilya (ed.). The Cambridge History of Iran. Vol. 2. Cambridge: Cambridge University Press. pp. 36–148. ISBN 978-0-521-20091-2.
- Hinz, Walther [in German] (1975). Altiranisches Sprachgut der Nebenüberleiferung [Old Iranian Language from Collateral Sources] (in German). Wiesbaden, Germany: Harrassowitz. p. 208. ISBN 978-3-447-01703-9.
- Schmitt, Rüdiger (2011). Iranisches Personennamenbuch [Book of Iranian Personal Names] (in German). Vol. 5.5a. Verlag der Österreichischen Akademie der Wissenschaften. ISBN 978-3-700-17142-3.
- Sulimirski, Tadeusz; Taylor, T. F. (1991). "The Scythians". In Boardman, John; Edwards, I. E. S.; Hammond, N. G. L.; Sollberger, E.; Walker, C. B. F. (eds.). The Cambridge Ancient History. Vol. 3. Cambridge: Cambridge University Press. pp. 547–590. ISBN 978-1-139-05429-4.
