= Tanausis =

Legendary king of the Goths

Tanausis was a legendary king of the Goths, according to Jordanes's Getica (5.47). The 19th-century scholar Alfred von Gutschmid assigned his reign to 1323 BC – 1290 BC.

According to the Getica, he was the Gothic king who halted the advance of the Egyptian armies of the Egyptian king Sesostris (whom Jordanes calls Vesosis). At a battle on the banks of the river Phasis, Tanausis routed the Egyptian king who had already conquered the Ethiopians and the Scythians.

Some historians have said that the War of Vesosis and Tanausis may not have happened and is combination of transcription errors or fantasy.

The Getica states that Tanausis then pursued the Egyptians all the way back to the banks of the Nile, where the mighty river and the fortifications dissuaded him from slaying Sesostris "in his own land". The territory Tanausis had conquered in Asia was then bestowed upon his close friend Sornus, king of the Medes. Some of Tanausis' followers remained in the conquered lands, and Jordanes cites Pompeius Trogus as saying these were the origin of the Parthians, stating that in the Scythian language "Parthi" means "deserter" (5.48).

Following his death, Jordanes writes that the Goths worshipped Tanausis as a god.

The story also appears in the earlier history of Justin, who also based his work on Pompeius Trogus. However, the opponents are described as Sesosis of Egypt and Tanaus, king of Scythia. Jordanes considered the Goths to be Scyths, and often did not distinguish them. Comparisons have also been made to a statement by Isidore of Seville to the effect that the river Tanais (now the Don) had been named for one "Tanus", an ancestral king of Scythia.
