= Visio Karoli =

The Visio Karoli or Caroli ("Vision of Charles") may refer to either of two pieces of early medieval visionary literature:

- Visio Karoli Magni, about a dream of Charlemagne
- Visio Karoli Grossi, about a dream of Charles the Fat
