= Scythian genealogical myth =

Epic cycle of the Scythian religion

The Scythian genealogical myth was an epic cycle of the Scythian religion detailing the origin of the Scythians. This myth held an important position in the worldview of Scythian society, and was popular among both the Scythians of the northern Pontic region and the Greeks who had colonised the northern shores of the Pontus Euxinus.

== Narrative ==
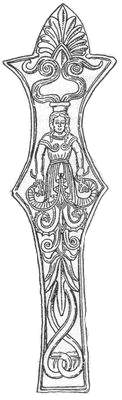
A depiction of the Snake-Legged Goddess on a horse plate from Tsymbalova mohyla

Five variants of the Scythian genealogical myth have been retold by Greco-Roman authors, which all traced the origin of the Scythians to the god Targī̆tavah and to the Scythian Snake-Legged Goddess:

1. Herodotus of Halicarnassus's recorded two variants of the myth, and according to his first version, one thousand years before the Scythians were invaded by the Persians in 513 BC, the first man born in hitherto desert Scythia was named Targitaos and was the son of "Zeus" (that is the Scythian Sky-god Pāpaya) and a daughter (that is the Scythian Earth-goddess Api) of the river Borysthenēs. Targitaos in turn had three sons, who each ruled a different part of the kingdom, named:
  - Lipoxais (Ancient Greek: Λιποξαις, romanized: Lipoxais; Latin: Lipoxais)
  - Arpoxais (Ancient Greek: Αρποξαις, romanized: Arpoxais; Latin: Arpoxais)
  - Kolaxais (Ancient Greek: Κολαξαις, romanized: Kolaxais; Latin: Colaxais)
  One day three gold objects – a battle-axe, a plough with a yoke, and a drinking cup – fell from the sky, and each brother in turn tried to pick the gold, but when Lipoxais and Arpoxais tried, it burst in flames, while the flames were extinguished when Kolaxais tried. Kolaxais thus became the guardian of this sacred gold (the hestiai of Tabiti), and the other brothers decided that he should become the high king and king of the Royal Scythians while they would rule different branches of the Scythians.
  Kolaxais in turn had three sons who each ruled a part of the Scythian kingdom.
2. According to the second version of the myth recorded by Herodotus, Hēraklēs arrived in deserted Scythia with Gēryōn's cattle. Because of the extremely cold weather of Scythia, Hēraklēs covered himself with his lion skin and went to sleep. When Hēraklēs woke up, he found that his mares had disappeared, and he searched for them until he arrived at a land called the Woodland (Ancient Greek: Υλαια, romanized: Hulaia; Latin: Hylaea), where in a cave he found a half-maiden, half-viper being who later revealed to him that she was the mistress of this country, and that she had kept Hēraklēs's horses, which she agreed to return them only if he had sexual intercourse with her. She returned his freedom to Hēraklēs after three sons were born of their union:
  - Agathyrsos (Ancient Greek: Αγαθυρσος, romanized: Agathursos; Latin: Agathyrsus)
  - Gelōnos (Ancient Greek: Γελωνος, romanized: Gelōnos; Latin: Gelonus)
  - Skythēs (Ancient Greek: Σκυθης, romanized: Skuthēs; Latin: Scythes)
  Before Hēraklēs left Scythia, the serpent maiden asked him what should be done once the boys had reached adulthood, and he gave her his girdle and one of his two bows, and told her that they should be each tasked with stringing the bow and putting on the girdle in the correct way, with whoever succeeded being the one who would rule his mother's land while those who would fail the test would be banished. When the time for the test had arrived, only the youngest of the sons, Skythēs, was able to correctly complete it, and he thus became the ancestor of the Scythians and their first king, with all subsequent Scythian kings claiming descent from him. Agathyrsos and Gelōnos, who were exiled, became the ancestors of the Agathyrsoi and Gelōnoi.
3. A third variant of the myth, recorded by Gaius Valerius Flaccus, described the Scythians as descendants of Colaxes (Latin: Colaxes), who was himself a son of the god Iūpiter with a half-serpent nymph named Hora.
  - The version of the myth recorded by Gaius Valerius Flaccus suggests that Herodotus's first version of the Scythian genealogical myth might have ended with Lipoxais and Arpoxais murdering Kolaxais.
4. The fourth variant of the myth, recorded by Diodorus of Sicily, calls Skythēs the first Scythian and the first king, and describes him as a son of "Zeus" and an earth-born viper-limbed maiden.
5. The fifth version of the myth, recorded in the Tabula Albana, recorded that after Hēraklēs had defeated the river-god Araxēs, he fathered two sons with his daughter Echidna, who were named Agathyrsos and Skythēs, who became the ancestors of the Scythians.

Family tree of the Scythian gods

Tabiti; Scythian: Tapatī	Borysthenes; Scythian: Baurastāna or Baurustāna
Papaios; Scythian: Pāpayah	Api; Scythian: Api	Araxes
Artimpasa	Targitaos; Scythian: Targī̆tavah	Snake-Legged Goddess
Lipoxais; Scythian: Lipoxšayah	Arpoxais; Scythian: R̥buxšayah	Kolaxais; Scythian: Kolaxšayah
Three sons

Among the two versions of the genealogical myth recorded by Herodotus of Halicarnassus, the first one was the closest to the original Scythian form, while the second one was a more Hellenised version which had been adapted to fit Greek mythological canons.

Some regional variations of the genealogical myth might have existed in Scythia, including possibly one which placed the setting of the myth near the mouth of the Tyras river, at the location of the city of Tyras, which was initially called "the snake-filled" (Ancient Greek: Οφιουσσα, romanized: Ophioussa) by the Greeks, possibly because the local inhabitants claimed that the home of the serpent-legged Scythian ancestral goddess was located there rather than at Hylaea.

The myth of the golden objects which fell from the sky was also present among other Scythic peoples such as the Saka of Central Asia, and therefore must have been an ancient Iranian tradition.

== Interpretation ==
=== The Snake-Legged Goddess ===
The serpent-mother's traits are consistent across the multiple versions of the genealogical myth and include her being the daughter of either a river-god or of the Earth and dwelling in a cave, as well as her being half-woman and half-snake. The Scythian foremother was also an androgynous goddess who was often represented in art as being bearded.

The Snake-Legged Goddess was thus a primordial ancestress of humanity, which made her a liminal figure who founded a dynasty, and was therefore only half-human in appearance while still looking like a snake, itself being a creature capable of passing between the worlds of the living and of the dead with no hindrance.

The snake aspect of the goddess is linked to the complex symbology of snakes in various religions due to their ability to disappear into the ground, their venom, the shedding of their skin, their fertility, and their coiling movements, which are associated with the underworld, death, renewal, and fertility: being able to pass from the worlds above and below the earth, as well as of bringing both death and prosperity, snakes were symbols of fertility and revival. The legs of the goddess were sometimes instead depicted as tendrils, which also had a similar function by representing fertility, prosperity, renewal, and the afterlife because they grow from the Earth within which the dead were placed and blossom again each year.

The Snake-Legged Goddess was also a feminine deity who appeared in an androgynous form in ritual and cult, as well as in iconography and ritual. This androgyny represented the full inclusiveness of the Snake-Legged Goddess in her role as the primordial ancestress of humanity. The androgyny of the Snake-Legged Goddess also enhanced her inherent duality represented by her snake and tendril limbs.

The role of the Snake-Legged Goddess in the genealogical myth is not unlike those of sirens and similar non-human beings in Greek mythology, who existed as transgressive women living outside of society and refusing to submit to the yoke of marriage, but instead chose their partners and forced them to join her. Nevertheless, unlike the creatures of Greek myth, the Scythian serpent-maiden did not kill Hēraklēs, who tries to win his freedom from her.

The identification of the father of the Snake-Legged Goddess with the river-god Araxes corresponds to the non-mythological origin of the Scythians as recorded by Herodotus of Halicarnassus, according to which the Scythians initially lived along the Araxes river until the Massagetae expelled them from their homeland, after which they crossed the Araxes river and migrated westwards.

==== The myth of Aphroditē Apatouros ====
The Scythian genealogical myth was a continuation of the legend of Aphroditē Apatouros (Αφροδιτη Απατουρος) and the Giants as recorded by Strabo, according to which the goddess Aphroditē Apatouros had been attacked by Giants and called on Hēraklēs for help. After concealing Hēraklēs, the goddess, under guise of introducing the Giants one by one, treacherously handed them to Hēraklēs, who killed them. Aphroditē Apatouros and "Hēraklēs" then buried the Giants under the earth, due to which volcanic activity remained a constant in the region of Apatouron.

Aphroditē Apatouros was the same goddess as the Snake-Legged Goddess of the Scythian genealogical myth, while "Hēraklēs" was in fact Targī̆tavah, and her reward to him for defeating the Giants was her love.

The Greek poet Hesiod might have mentioned this legend in the Theogony, where he assimilated the Snake-Legged Goddess to the monstrous figure of Echidna from Greek mythology. In Hesiod's narrative, "Echidna" was a serpent-nymph living in a cave far from any inhabited lands, and the god Targī̆tavah, assimilated to the Greek hero Hēraklēs, killed two of her children, namely the Hydra of Lerna and the lion of Nemea. Thus, in this story, "Hēraklēs" functioned as a destroyer of evils and a patron of human dwellings located in place where destruction had previously prevailed.

=== "Hēraklēs" ===
The "Hēraklēs" of Herodotus of Halicarnassus's second version and from the Tabula Albana's version of the genealogical myth is not the Greek hero Hēraklēs, but the Scythian god Targī̆tavah, who appears in the other recorded variants of the genealogical myth under the name of Targitaos or Skythēs as a son of "Zeus" (that is, the Scythian Sky Father Papaios), and was likely assimilated by the Greeks from the northern shores of the Black Sea with the Greek Hēraklēs because of his important role in the foundational myths of the Greek colonists throughout the Mediterranean basin.

The arrival of "Hēraklēs" in the deserted Scythia corresponds to the mythical motif of the conquest of the empty land by the brave invader, while the stealing of his mares by the serpent maiden corresponds to the cattle-raid motif of Indo-Iranic mythology.

The reference to "Hēraklēs" driving the cattle of Gēryōn also reflects the motif of the cattle-stealing god widely present among Indo-Iranic peoples, and the reference to him stealing Gēryōn's cattle after defeating him in Herodotus of Halicarnassus's second version of the genealogical myth and of his victory against the river-god Araxēs in the Tabula Albana's version were Hellenised versions of an original Scythian myth depicting the typical mythological theme of the fight of the mythical ancestor-hero, that is of Targī̆tavah, against the chthonic forces, through which he slays the incarnations of the primordial chaos to create the Cosmic order.

The Hellenised myth of Targī̆tavah staying in Scythia might have been recorded in the Orpheōs Argonautika, which mentions a bull-riding cattle-thief Titan, who, in this Hellenised narrative, might have been "Hēraklēs," to whom Targī̆tavah was identified, and who created the Cimmerian Bosporus by cutting a passage from the Maeotian swamp.

The stolen horses and the bow of Targī̆tavah in the second variant of the genealogical myth connected him to the equestrianism and archery of the Scythians.

The peoples of Scythia believed that Targī̆tavah had left a two-cubit long footprint in the territory of the Tyragetae, in the region of the middle Tyras river, which the local peoples of this area displayed proudly. Since only gods were able to leave footprints on the hard rock, this footprint was held as a sign of divine protection, and, being the ancestor of the Scythians, he became their protector and laid claim to their country and all of its inhabitants for eternity by pressing his footprint into the Scythian rock.

Targī̆tavah might also have been identified by the Greeks in southern Scythia with Achilles Pontarkhēs (lit. 'Achilles, Lord of the Pontic Sea'), in which role he was associated with the Snake-Legged Goddess and was the father of her three sons.

=== Cosmogenesis ===
This myth explained the origin of the world, and therefore begun with the Heaven father Pāpaya and the Earth-and-Water Mother Api being already established in their respective places, following the Iranic cosmogenic tradition. This was followed by the process of creation proper through the birth of the first man, Targī̆tavah.

=== Ethnogenesis ===
The Scythian genealogical myth also ascribed the origin of the Scythians to the Scythian Sky Father Papaios, either directly or through his son Targī̆tavah, and to the Snake-Legged Goddess affiliated to Artimpasa, and also represented the threefold division of the universe into the Heavens, the Earth, and the Underworld, as well as the division of Scythian society into the warrior, priest, and agriculturalist classes.

==== The desert ====
The original deserted state of the land of Scythia when Targī̆tavah first arrived there in the myth followed the motif of the primordial state of the land, which was devastated and barren before the first king finally ended this state of chaos by establishing the tilling of the land and the practice of agriculture. One of the themes of both Herodotean versions of the Scythian genealogical myth as well as of the other Scythian origin myth known as the "Polar Cycle" is that of the Scythians' occupation of the virgin land.

=== The sons of Targī̆tavah ===
==== Lipoxais, Arpoxais, and Kolaxais ====
The names of Targī̆tavah's sons in the first version of the genealogical myth – Lipoxais, Arpoxais, and Kolaxais – end with the suffix "-xais," which is a Hellenisation of the Old Iranian term xšaya meaning ruler:

- Lipoxais, from Scythian *Lipoxšayah, from an earlier form *Δipoxšayah, means "king of radiance," in the sense of "king of the sun."

The first element, *δipa-, is derived from the Indo-European root *dyew-, meaning "to be bright" a well as "sky" and "heaven," and can also give the name the meaning of "king of heaven."

- Arpoxais, from Scythian *R̥buxšayah, means "king of the skillful" and "king of the toilers," as well as "king of the airspace."

The element *r̥bu- might have been a cognate of the Sanskrit term Ṛbhú (ऋभु), which is the name of a group of Indic deities of the airspace.

- Kolaxais, from Scythian *Kolaxšayah, means "poleaxe-wielding king" or "hammer-wielding king," as well as "sceptre-wielding king," "thunderer king," and "blacksmith king," with the latter meaning "ruling king of the lower world."

===== The layers of the cosmos =====
The names of the three sons of Targī̆tavah therefore corresponded to the three layers of the cosmos:

- Lipoxšayah was the "King of Radiance," and therefore of the Heavens;
- R̥buxšayah was the King of the Airspace, and therefore of lightning;
- Kolaxšayah was the Poleaxe/Hammer/Sceptre-wielding King and the Thunderer and Blacksmith king, and therefore of the Lower World.

===== Progenitors of the social classes =====
The genealogical myth also represented the formation of the three social classes of Scythian society, namely the warrior-aristocracy, the clergy, and the peasantry, with each of the sons of Targī̆tavah being forebears of social classes constituting the Scythian people:

- Lipoxais was the ancestor of the Aukhatai (Ancient Greek: Αυχαται, romanized: Aukhatai; Latin: Auchatae);
  - The original Scythian form of the Hellenised name Aukhatai might have been *Vahuta, meaning "the blessed ones" or "the holy ones."
- Arpoxais was the ancestor of the Katiaroi (Ancient Greek: Κατιαροι, romanized: Katiaroi; Latin: Catiari) and the Traspies (Ancient Greek: Τρασπιες, romanized: Traspies; Latin: Traspies);
  - The original Scythian form of Traspies might have been derived from Trāspā, meaning "three horses."
  - The original Scythian form of the Hellenised name Katiaroi might have been *Gaucahrya, meaning "possessors of cattle pastures";
- Kolaxais was the ancestor of the Paralatai (Ancient Greek: Παραλαται, romanized: Paralatai; Latin: Paralatae), also known as the Royal Scythians, who were the warrior-aristocracy of the Scythians.
  - The name Paralatai was a Greek reflection of the Scythian name Paralāta, which was a title held by the Scythian warrior-aristocracy to which the kings belonged, with the kings being members of the Paralāta, although not all the Paralāta were kings. The name Paralāta was a cognate of the Avestan title Paraδāta (𐬞𐬀𐬭𐬀𐬜𐬁𐬙𐬀), which means "first created."

The three sons of Targī̆tavah represented the division of Scythian society into a system of tripartite classes which existed among all the Indo-European peoples, and is well-attested among the Indo-Iranic peoples, such as the pištra three-fold class system of Zoroastrianism, as well as the varṇa system of the Indic peoples which divided the societies of the Indic peoples into the clerical class of the brāhmaṇa, the military aristocracy of the kṣatriya to which belonged the warriors and kings, and the wealth-producing ordinary community members of the vaiśya.

These three classes, in turn, each corresponded to the typically Indo-Iranic tripartite structure of the universe of Scythian cosmology, which is also present in the Vedic and Avestan traditions, and according to which the universe was composed of the heavens, the airspace, and the earth.

The three sons of Targī̆tavah were thus ancestors of the various social classes of Scythian society who also represented the three levels of the Cosmos: the upper celestial realm, the middle sphere of the airspace, and the lower terrestrial world, with the central son representing the airspace linking the two others, which also parallels the roles of the Sky Father Papaios, the Earth-and-Water Mother Api, and their child, Targī̆tavah, that is the airspace.

====== The warrior class ======
The Scythian genealogical myth thus assigned to the Scythian kings a divine ancestry through descent from Kolaxais, as attested when the Scythian king Idanthyrsus claimed Papaios as his ancestor. The name Paralatai was a Greek reflection of the Scythian name Paralāta, which was a title held by Scythian kings, and was also a cognate of the Avestan title Paraδāta (𐬞𐬀𐬭𐬀𐬜𐬁𐬙𐬀), which means "first created."

According to the version of the genealogical myth recorded by Gaius Valerius Flaccus, Kolaxais and his warriors decorated their shields with "fires divided into three parts," flashing lightning, and pictures of red wings, with the colour red being characteristic of the warrior class in Indo-Iranic tradition.

====== The priestly class ======
In Gaius Valerius Flaccus's narrative, Auchus, that is Lipoxais, was born with white hair and wore a band which passed around his head three times and whose ends hanged backwards, with the colour white in Indo-Iranic tradition being that of priesthood, and the headband of Auchus being part of a priest's regalia which was depicted in the art of the various ancient Iranian peoples. These thus signalled Lipoxais as the progenitor of Aukhatai, that is the priestly component of Scythian society's tripartite class system.

====== The farmer class ======
Arpoxais, meanwhile, was the progenitor of the Katiaroi and Traspies, who formed the third section of the Scythian class system, that of the ordinary populace consisting of farmers and horse-breeders.

The sub-division of the farmer class into two groups, namely the Katiaroi connected to cattle the Traspies connected to horses, fits an Indo-Iranic motif of which the other iterations include the Zoroastrian Gə̄uš Uruuan (whose name means "the soul of the cow") and Druuāspā (whose name means "(the deity) with healthy horses"), as well as the Vedic Aśvins and their sons in later Hindu tradition, Nakula and Sahadeva. The name of the Traspies, likely derived from Scythian Trāspā, meaning "three horses," is also semantically connected to that of the Aśvins.

====== The gold objects and the class structure ======
The three golden objects which fell from the sky also represented the various Scythian classes:

- the battle-axe represents the warrior-aristocracy;
  - the battle-axe also functioned as a royal sceptre or staff
- the cup, used during religious rituals for offering libations and to prepare haoma, representing the priestly class;
- the plough used by farmers to till the fields and the yoke associated with cattle-breeding represented the lowest class of the Katiaroi and Traspies.

The golden objects, that is the hestiai of Tabiti, as attested by their fiery nature, were the fires of the three classes of Scythian society, with the triunity of the Scythian hestiai representing the concept of fire, represented by the goddess Tabiti, being the primeval and all-encompassing element permeating the world and being present throughout it.

Although each of the three gold objects each corresponded to one of the three layers of the Scythian tripartite class structure, the fact that they all came into the possession of Kolaxais and his descendants meant that they had no connections to his elder brothers who also corresponded to two of the three Scythian social classes.

The plough-and-yoke and the cup, although representing the farmer and priestly functions, were instead symbols of royal power used in the coronation rites of the Scythian king, which themselves found a parallel in the rājasūya consecration ceremony of Indic kings. The acquisition of the objects by Kolaxais represented the Scythian royal coronation ritual, according to which the world order was disturbed by the death of the previous king and was restored through the coronation of the new king.

The falling of the three objects from the sky and Kolaxais coming to possessing them was also a myth of the transfer of power from the older generation of gods to the newer one, similar to power leaving Ouranos in ancient Greek religion and Varuṇa in ancient Vedic religion to pass on to the newer generations.

===== Kingship =====
====== Kingship and the fārnā ======
The Scythian genealogical myth was a variant of an old Indo-European tradition present among the Indo-Iranic peoples, especially those who were part of the steppe cultures, according to which the royal dynasty and, by extension, the nation itself, were born from the union of a serpent-nymph and a travelling hero who was searching for his stolen horses. This motif became widely widespread in the region of the Caucasus.

Therefore, the ownership of the three golden objects which fell from the sky, which constituted the hestiai of Tabiti, by Kolaxais and his descendants constituted a heaven-given manifestation of divine origin of the royal power of the Scythian kings, and of the kings' proximity to Tabiti. The Scythian goddess Tabiti was herself linked to the fārnā, and the ownership of her hestiai thus provided to Kolaxais the fārnā (Avestan: 𐬓𐬀𐬭𐬆𐬥𐬀𐬵, romanized: x^{v}ar^{ə}nah), that is the royal splendour, which among Iranic peoples was believed to transform the king into a sacred figure and a kind of deity who was sometimes believed to be the brother of the Sun and the Moon. Among the Scythic peoples, this notion of the association of the Sun with kingship was attested by the Massagetaean practice of sacrificing horses to the Sun-god.

The importance of the fārnā among the many Scythic peoples is attested by the fact that it is the most widespread element among recorded Scytho-Sarmatian names in the Pontic Steppe region.

The hestiai of Tabiti were thus the physical manifestations of the fārnā and were guarded by the kings, with this association being evident in how the golden objects burnt the brothers who were unworthy of kingship, but did not harm the legitimate king, Kolaxais. Like the typically Iranic conceptions of the fārnā attested in the Zoroastrian and Persian myths, the Scythian fārnā was of heavenly origin, and represented an emanation of the sacred fire, and therefore could be itself depicted as objects made of or decorated with gold. It was the fārnā who chose the king, legitimised him, and guaranteed his power, while the king himself was seen as being unable of being burnt like fire.

The Scythian concept of the fārnā was thus tripartite, with all of its three components belonging together to the king, although they could leave the king if he became unworthy. The three components of the fārnā also represented an emanation of the celestial fire and each corresponded to one of the three social classes of Scythian society, and were worshipped in religious rites.

All Iranic peoples considered gold to be a symbol of fārnā and its material incarnation, as well as the metal of the warrior-aristocracy, with the ownership of the fārnā in the form of gold being necessary for a warrior to be victorious. Thus, the connection of the fārnā and gold with the king represented its connection to the warrior-aristocracy to which the kings belonged. In consequence, Iranic kings surrounded themselves with gold, which was supposed to help them preserve their fārnā, hence why Scythian kings only used gold cups, which represented the priestly role of royal power. Due to this, the cups placed in the burials of the earliest Scythian kings at Kelermes were all made of gold.

Because the fārnā was believed to have a solar nature, and therefore to be dangerous and capable of harming ordinary humans, the Scythian kings avoided direct contact with members of the populace, and instead communicated with them through the means of royally-appointed messengers who were buried with the kings after their deaths.

====== Kingship and the social classes ======
At the same time, the Scythian physical form of the royal fārnā consisted of three objects which each represented one of the three social classes of Scythian society, with the king himself thus encompassing and transcending these classes.

The narrative of the ancestor of the Paralāta, Kolaxais, succeeding in acquiring the gold objects, that is the hestiai of Tabiti, which had fallen from the sky was also an explanation of the supremacy of the tribe descended from him, that is the Royal Scythians, over the other Scythian tribes, and of the Scythian kings, who bore the title of Paralāta. The ownership of the hestiai of Tabiti thus gave to Kolaxais the right to rule, and they also represented the king's role whereby, as the ruler of all society, he also represented all the social classes, being this the chief warrior, the chief priest, and the chief farmer, with all three social roles united within him.

This conceptualisation of the king originating from the warrior-aristocracy but at the same time encompassing the three social functions and representing all the classes by being himself the incarnation of society was one of the fundamental concepts of Indo-Iranic ideology. This practise was also present among the Indic peoples, where the king originated from the kṣatriya warrior aristocracy, and was proclaimed to be a member of the brāhmaṇa priestly caste and symbolically married the brāhmaṇa, and then did the same with the vaiśya producer caste. Other Indic coronation rites also included the symbolic birth of the king from the brāhmaṇa and vaiśya castes, thus becoming a member of all three castes at the same time. Although information about coronation rites among the Iranic peoples is meagre, this appears to have been the case among them too.

Thus, the passage of the Scythian genealogical myth regarding the three brothers explained how the three sons of Targī̆tavah represented the three social classes, with the youngest of the sons, Kolaxais, who was the warrior, also united within himself the function of all three classes. It also explained the dominant role of the warrior-aristocratic class over the other classes.

The version of the Scythian genealogical myth retold by Diodorus of Sicily also made the sons of Skythes the progenitors of the social classes:

- the Paloi corresponded to the warrior class of the Paralāta,
- the Napoi corresponded to the rest of the Katiaroi and Traspies.

Pliny the Elder recorded a Scythian myth, according to which a struggle between the Paloi and the Napoi resulted in the destruction of the latter by the former, representing the establishment of the supremacy of the warrior class over the producer class. Only the warrior and producer classes are mentioned in this myth because the priestly class was completely subordinate to the warrior aristocracy.

====== Kingship and institutions ======
The Scythian genealogical myth originated among the royalty, and was used by the Scythian kings to establish the divine origin of their kingship and their right to rule by virtue of being the descendants of Kolaxais. By asserting the supremacy of the youngest brother over the elder ones, the genealogical myth also assigned such a preeminence to the Scythians, who claimed to be the "youngest of all peoples."

The genealogical myth also ascribed to the Scythians' political and social institutions an antiquity dating back to the mythical era of the ancestors, which in the Scythian worldview was seen as ensuring the "correctness" of these institutions, which in turn guaranteed the stability and prosperity of Scythian society.

In the genealogical myth, Targī̆tavah, the first man born from the union of the Heavenly Father and the Earth-and-Water Mother, represented the primordial unity. This unity incarnated by Targī̆tavah soon underwent fragmentation on the levels of kinship due to Targī̆tavah having three sons, ethnicity and territory in the form of each son founding a different tribe, and class due to the three objects representing three social classes and their respective functions. This fragmentation was finally stopped when the three objects chose Kolaxais, who became king when he gained possession of the gold objects which formed the totality of kingship, and his brothers proved themselves to be unworthy of possessing them and therefore became subordinate to him and the peoples descended from them became subordinate to the descendants of Kolaxais.

After the loss of the primordial state of perfect unity, the gods sought to restore as much of this unity as feasible by choosing Kolaxais, who thus encompassed and reintegrated the fragmented elements of the primordial totality within himself by becoming king.

In consequence, the following Scythian kings kept the gold objects as both a royal and national treasure which acted as the symbol and legitimising source of their power and position, and which they had to renew each year through religious rituals to preserve the welfare and unity of the Scythians. Thus, priest-kings were in charge of restoring the lost primordial unity among the Scythians.

==== The sons of Kolaxais ====
The division of the Scythian kingdom between the three sons of Kolaxais transposed the Scythian three-fold cosmological structure and social structure composed of three classes onto the institution of Scythian kingship, and therefore also explained the division of Scythia into three kingdoms of which the king of the Royal Scythians was the High King. Thus, Scythia was ruled by three kings, of whom one was the supreme king who guarded the hestiai of Tabiti. This threefold kingship is a structure recorded in historical times in Herodotus's account of the Scythian campaign of the Persian king Darius I, when the Scythians were ruled by the three kings, namely Idanthyrsus, Skōpasis, and Taxakis, with Idanthyrsus being the Scythian high king while Skōpasis and Taxakis were sub-kings.

Kolaxais's partition of his kingdom among his three sons also explained the three-fold division of the Scythians into the three tribal groupings of the Royal Scythians, the Nomadic Scythians, and the Agricultural Scythians.

==== The horse of Kolaxais ====
The mention of a "horse of Kolaxais" (Ancient Greek: ιππος Κολαξαιος, romanized: hippos Kolaxaios) in a partheneion, recorded by Alcman and dedicated to Artemis Orthia or the Dioscuri, suggests that Kolaxais possessed an unruly and fabulous horse of a fiery nature which had a white coat. This horse might have been believed to be the ancestor of all war horses.

According to Valerius Flaccus's version of the genealogical myth, the horse of Kolaxais was killed by the Greek hero Jason, who then killed Kolaxais himself. This might reflect the passage of the Scythian genealogical myth where Kolaxais himself was murdered by his brothers.

=== Agathyrsos, Gelōnos, Skythēs ===
The sons of Targī̆tavah according to the second version of the genealogical myth were each also ancestors of tribes belonging to the Scythian cultures:

- Agathyrsos was the ancestor of the Agathyrsoi,
- Gelōnos was the ancestor of the Gelōnoi,
- Skythēs was the ancestor of the Scythians proper, who were named after him.

Each of the sons of Targī̆tavah in the second version of the genealogical myth respectively corresponded to the sons from the first version, with Agathyrsos corresponding to Lipoxais, Gelōnos corresponding to Arpoxais, and Skythēs corresponding to Kolaxais.

The "horse of Kolaxais" from the partheneion of Alcman might alternatively have referred to Scythian horses in general due to the Scythians possibly being considered to be "Kolaxais-ians" because of the identification of Skythēs with Kolaxais.

==== The trial of the sons ====
The tasks which the sons of Targī̆tavah had to perform as trial in this second version of the genealogical myth consisted of stringing a bow, and strapping a tight belt to which was attached a cup.

- The bow was a military tool, with a similar set of tools being attributes of the Indic kṣatriya, and it corresponded to the battle-axe which formed part of the hestiai of the first version of the genealogical myth. This bow was therefore used to find out which brother was the warrior and would therefore be the ancestor of the warrior class.
- The belt with the cup attached to it was a sacerdotal tool, with the belt being associated to priests in Indo-Iranic tradition: adherents of Zoroastrianism had to start wearing the kustīg from a young age, attesting of the initiatic role of the belt; and the belt was also used in the initiation rites of the Indic brāhmaṇa priestly caste; therefore, the belt with a cup attacked to it represented the Scythian king's role as a priest. Thus, after having proven that he was a warrior, Skythēs also obtained the cup and therefore earned the right to perform priestly functions.
  - Herodotus claimed that the Scythians of his time still wore cups hanging from their belts in memory of Skythēs.

The trial of the sons of Targī̆tavah was a warrior's trial as well as a priest's trial through which Skythēs, as the king, united the social classes composing Scythian society within himself. Thus, Skythēs was the first king and the progenitors of the Scythian kings.

The possession of the bow of Targī̆tavah in the second version of the Scythian genealogical myth thus corresponded to the possession of the hestiai in the first version, and the function of both was to test the candidate for kingship, with these objects collectively symbolising power and the king's acquisition of them meaning that he passed the rest to become the ruler. The acquisition of the hestiai and the bow of Targī̆tavah therefore was part of the king's initiation ritual.

The belt with a cup attached to it was also a symbol of royal power in multiple Iranic traditions, and the cup itself was used in coronation rites among the many Indo-Iranic peoples, including the Scythians. Golden cups were also placed in the burials of deceased kings.

The cup and the arrows were elements of the Scythian coronation rituals, but they were also symbols of unity among the Scythians, as were the axe and spear, hence why whenever the Scythians concluded a treaty of friendship, they poured wine in a cup and lowered a sword, arrows, an axe, and a spear into it.

Similarly, in the story of the cauldron of Ariantas, each arrowhead represented a Scythian warrior individually, and the copper vessel standing at the Holy Ways which made from all of the arrowheads functioned as the ritual unification of the Scythians.

The arrows and the cup were thus symbols of royal power used in the coronation rites of the Scythian king, which themselves found a parallel in the rājasūya consecration ceremony of Indic kings. The acquisition of these objects by Kolaxais represented the Scythian royal coronation ritual, according to which the world order was disturbed by the death of the previous king and was restored through the coronation of the new king.

==== The name of the Scythians ====
The second version of the Scythian genealogical myth also explained the origin of the name of the Scythians as being derived from that of Skythēs (Skuδa in early Scythian; Skula in later Scythian), whose name meant "archer," and after whom the Scythians were called Skuδa (Skula in later Scythian), meaning "archers."

==== Hellenisation ====
The second version of the genealogical myth was one that had been Hellenised, which was not an uncommon practice of ancient Greeks done with the aim of including Barbarian peoples into the orbit of their own civilisation. Greek colonists who settled in remote peripheral regions often connected these new areas to their own myths, deities, and heroes by identifying Greek heroes with the local peoples' mythological forefathers.

In Greek mythology, Hēraklēs had killed the giant Gēryōn and seized his cows, after which he sailed from Gēryōn's home island of Erytheia to Tartēssos in Iberia, from where he passed by the city of Abdēra and reached Liguria, and then going south to Italy and sailing to Sicily: on the way, he founded several cities and settlements which the Greeks supposedly later "regained." The population of new territories with characters from Greek mythology and history was thus done to justify their acquisition, and therefore the Greeks turned Hēraklēs into a founder of various nations, dynasties, and cities throughout the Oikoumenē from Iberia to India, with these feats being described in several epic Hērakleidēs which were composed and enjoyed popularity within ancient Greek society.

These various stories relating Hēraklēs to various ancestral heroes of non-Greek peoples often followed the same narrative of Hēraklēs returning from Erytheia after defeating the giant Gēryōn and stealing his cattle before losing his animals due to them being stolen by an often monstrous figure, after which Hēraklēs had to reacquire his animals by challenging the thief. Within the context of the Scythian genealogical myth, such a story of Hēraklēs was transposed onto the narrative of the union with the snake-maiden so as to emphasise his differences with his Scythian children, while Hēraklēs himself left nothing but a footprint in Scythia.

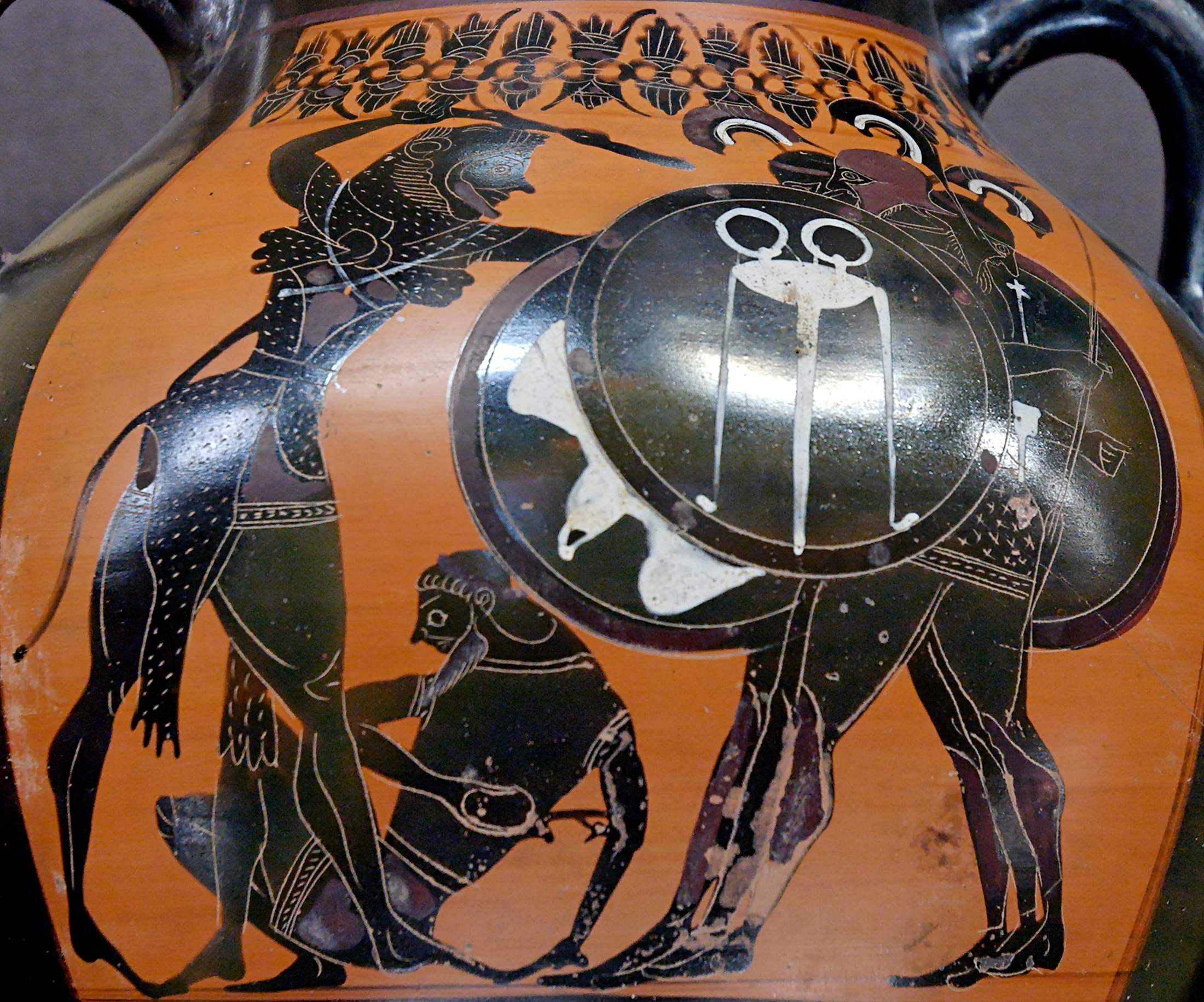
Hēraklēs fighting Gēryōn. 6th century BCE Greek amphora.

The Hellenisation of the Scythian genealogical myth was, consequently, carried out probably by the Pontic Olbians to further their own interests among the Scythians. Therefore, the Iranic cosmological features such as the union of heaven and earth and the birth of the primordial unity represented by Targī̆tavah were ignored, and humanity as well as divisions in terms of gender, geography, status, and ethnicity had already come into existence. Therefore, version of the Scythian genealogical legend Hellenised by the Pontic Greeks featured one of the most prominent Greek heroes and took place following his adventure on the sunset island of Erytheia where lived Gēryōn.

Thus, the production of cultic propaganda for the Greek heroes and deities was done by the colonists to establish their own rights over the lands where they had settled, as well as over the areas around them and their non-Greek populations, and the figures of Hēraklēs and Achilles were important in this process among the Greeks of Olbia and Borysthenes, with Hēraklēs being made into a divine coloniser who civilised the three peoples of Scythia and becoming the father of their eponymous ancestors.

The Olbia-centricity of this variant of the myth is exhibited by the mention of Hylaea, which was close to Pontic Olbia, but also by how it constituted an explanation for the cult of Targī̆tavah-Hēraklēs there. Nevertheless, even this Hellenised myth still contained many Scythian elements which had equivalents in various Iranic traditions.

In this version of the myth, the snake legs of the mother goddess and her dwelling place within the earth marked her as a native of Scythia. The ambiguous features of the mother goddess, such as her being both human and animal, high-ranking and base, monstrous and seductive, at the same time, corresponded to Greek perceptions of Scythian natives. Therefore, although she ruled over the land, her kingdom was empty, cold, uninhabited, and without any signs of civilisation. Thus, her status was inferior to that of Hēraklēs in this version of the myth regarding her appearance as well as her role within the myth itself, where she followed the advice and instructions of Hēraklēs but did not decide anything.

The Hellenised myth contrasted the chthonic cave-dwelling goddess with the Olympian Hēraklēs, who used the sun-chariot of Helios to complete certain of his labours and to rise to the deities of the celestial realm, and also possessed the bow of Apollo, which had similar attributes.

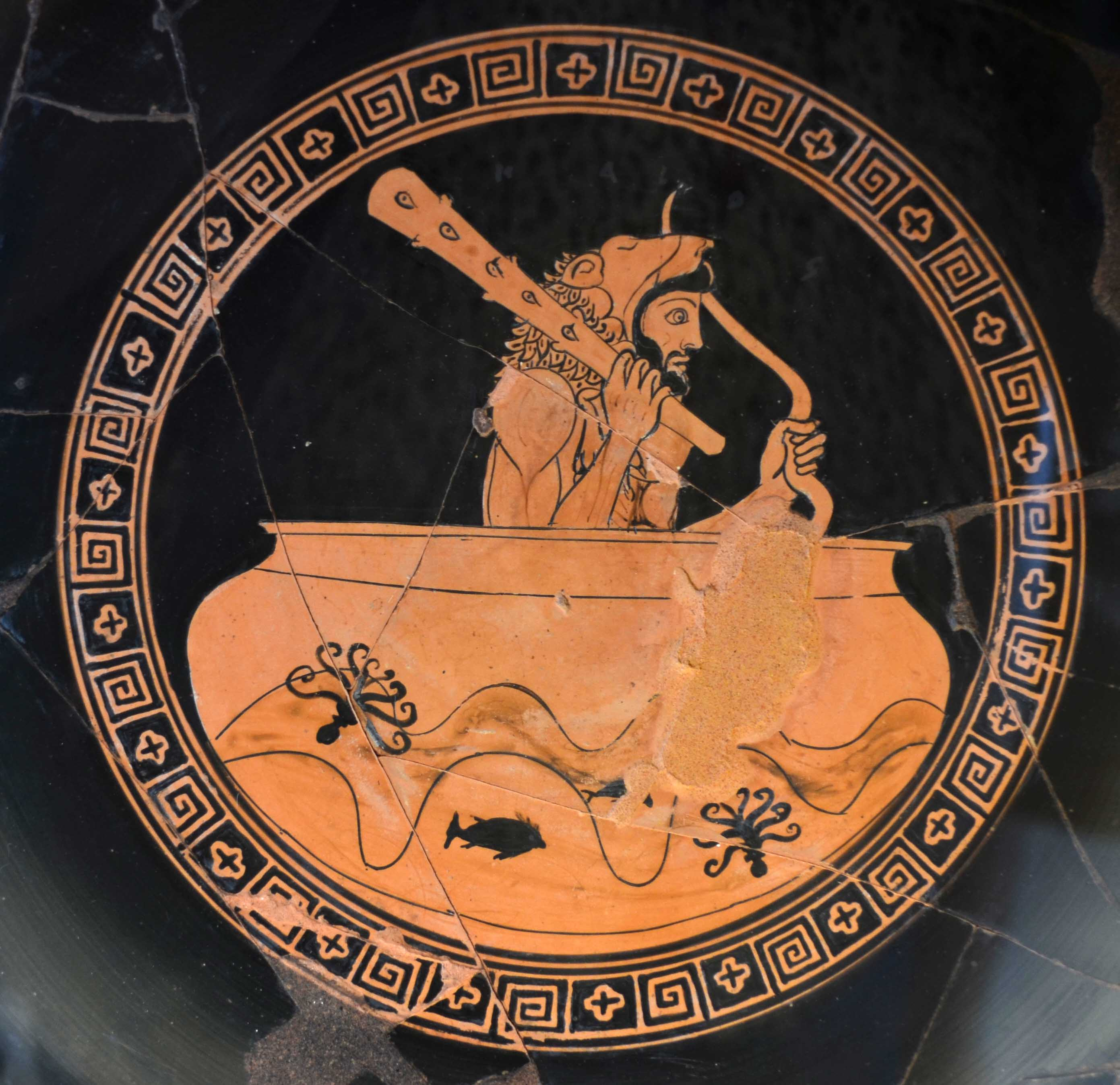
Hēraklēs in the bowl of the Sun-God Hēlios. 5th century BCE Etruscan kylix.

Therefore, it was Hēraklēs, a Greek, who incarnated both the power of otherness and the otherness of power, arrived into Scythia from abroad to change the situation: in this Hellenised version of the myth, it was through union with Hēraklēs that the pre-civilised Scythia could be transformed into a world more familiar to the Greeks by the introduction of the institution of kingship.

Meanwhile, the chthonic Scythian ancestress was later identified by the Graeco-Romans with the monstrous figure of Echidna from Hesiod's Theogony whom this latter author had located in Cilicia, which was then at the boundaries of Hesiod's known world, and whom Herodotus later located at the boundaries of his own known world, in the cold lands of Scythia that were separated from civilised eyes by the cold.

Unlike the negative role of Echidna and of various snakes in Greek mythology, the partially serpentine anatomy of the "Scythian Echidna" denoted her connection with the earth, and therefore of her autochthony, and her theft of the mares of Hēraklēs was more akin to the jokes played on their lovers by beautiful maidens who were always forgiven. And unlike the stories where the animals of Hēraklēs were stolen by hostile enemies, the serpent maiden instead opposed the hero's civilising march and in the end obtained an ambiguous victory by permitting him to leave a permanent sign of his passage through the descendance he had with her.

Before Hēraklēs left Scythia, the mother goddess asked him whether she should settle them in her own land or send them to Hēraklēs once they have grown up, which was a way for her to ask whether the sons were to be Scythians (if they were to live with their mother) or Greeks (if they were to live with their father). Hēraklēs's response was to give them his bow, belt, and cup, which were instruments of culture, and declared that whoever among them would be able to string the bow and gird himself with the belt would become king.

However, Hēraklēs did not claim any of the children and instead instructed that the son who passed his test and therefore was the most like Hēraklēs himself would inherit Scythia, while the other less able brothers who were therefore less like Hēraklēs would be exiled to the north, in the direction opposite to Hēraklēs's destination in Greece.

The bow of Hēraklēs itself represented prosperity, wisdom, and life, and the trial he instructed the mother to put their sons through was meant to choose the most intelligent, skillful and strong one among them to be the king. His sacred union with the Scythian goddess also represented that of the friendly interactions of the Greeks with non-Greeks.

Therefore, the addition of Hēraklēs in the second version of the genealogical myth ascribed to the Snake-Legged Goddess's sons a partial Greek ancestry, with the most youngest son proving himself to be the most worthy due to him being more Greek than his brothers through his physical prowess inherited from his father; as well as him obtaining the bow, belt and cup, which were tools of Greek culture; moreover, his inheritance of Scythia meant that he was the brother who lived the closest to the Greeks; and finally by establishing a "more virile" culture than his brothers, whose descendants, the promiscuous and luxury-loving Agathyrsi and the sedentary and farmer Gelonians, led lives which the Greeks perceived as being less masculine and therefore derived from their Asian mother.

This Hellenised version of the Scythian genealogical myth therefore presented Skythēs as being a largely but not completely Greek figure, and, in consequence, made his Scythian descendants a people of largely Greek origin. His bow, belt, and horses which he obtained from Hēraklēs were construed in this myth as gifts thanks to which Scythian warriors obtained their offensive, defensive, and mobile capabilities, while the traits which the Greeks perceived negatively among the Scythians, Agathyrsi, and Gelonians were ascribed to their pimordial mother.

The goal of this Hellenised Scythian genealogical myth was to impose a superiority of the Greeks over the Scythians as well as to establish a dependency of the Scythians on the Greeks regarding their "civilising" arts, and finally to portray the Scythians proper, who were more Hellenised, as being superior to their more northern and non-Hellenised neighbours such as the Agathyrsi and the Gelonians.

===== The divine footprint =====
The inhabitants of the Greek colony of Tyras, who identified Targī̆tavah with Hēraklēs, believed that the footprint near the Tyras river had been left by Hēraklēs, and that this was the location where he had attained immortality and divinity. Since only gods were able to leave footprints on the hard rock, this footprint was held among the Greeks as a sign of the divinity of Hēraklēs, with such footprints being held among Greeks to represent the presence of heroes and gods at cult sites.

The large size of the footprint was also linked to the ancient Greek image of gods and heroes being recognisable by their sizes and weight, so that the two cubit-long footprint could only have been left by a powerful hero whose body size corresponded to his body size, so that the achievements of Hēraklēs were only believable if they had been carried out by a hero from ancient times whose semi-divine origin manifested itself through a physique surpassing those of regular mortals of the post-mythical age.

===== Greek influence =====
To propagate this more Hellenised version of the genealogical myth which turned the Scythians into a people of partly Greek origin, and to compete with the first version of the myth, the Greek artisans on the northern shores of the Black Sea produced artistic depictions of this story to distribute as trade goods to the Scythians.

The role of Hēraklēs in Greek religion was that of a cultural hero who advanced human settlement and society by destroying incarnations of chaos, but he was also the archetype of the human conquest of death, with Gēryōn himself, whom Hēraklēs defeated, being a representation of death; this theme was continued in the myths of Hēraklēs going to the west to being the golden apples of the Hesperides and him dragging Cerberus out of the underworld. These myths transformed the figure of Hēraklēs into an unstoppable traveller who could go to the realm of Death and return from it.

Therefore, the Scythian rulers saw the Greek myth of their people as descendants from Hēraklēs as an attractive one, not unlike the similar beliefs held by the kings of Sparta and Macedonia. This is attested historically when the Macedonian king Philip II requested the permission of the later Scythian king Ateas to erect a statue to Hēraklēs at the mouth of the Danube, which shows that both the Macedonian and Scythian kings commonly respected Hēraklēs.

===== The Herodotean narrative =====
When Herodotus of Halicarnassus recorded the Hellenised version of the genealogical myth, he exhibited scepticism towards this narrative within his own text largely because he doubted that the Ocean encircled the earth, but also partly because he had close connections with the Western Greeks of Magna Graecia, who believed that Hēraklēs had driven the cattle of Gēryōn through their region of the world, and therefore did not accept that he had made a detour to the north to Scythia. Thus, Herodotus clarified that this was a myth told to him by the Pontic Greeks as a clarification to his Western Greek audience who would likely have been hostile to this myth.

Herodotus of Halicarnassus described this footprint as being the only wonder in Scythia. Its location, near the river Tyras, also had a symbolic value in the works of Herodotus, since in his worldview rivers separated not only great empires, but also the real world from the mythical world, so that anyone crossing them risked entering a strange world and could be punished through blindness. The status of Scythia as being uninhabited when Hēraklēs arrived there was itself described as a liminal area between the mythical and fantastical worlds in the narrative of Herodotus; the stormy and frosty climate of Scythia, which Herodotus typically used to describe distant lands inhabited by fantastical peoples and creatures, was also such an indication of Hēraklēs entering into a liminal region.

Since Herodotus perceived the Scythians and the Egyptians as being diametrical opposites, the footprint of Hēraklēs in Scythia was also the counterpart to the two cubit-long sandal of Perseus at Khemmis in Egypt: both marked places which had been sacralised by the appearance of heroes and where the divine and human realms overlapped; at the same time, while Hēraklēs had left his permanent footprint in Scythia, Perseus instead had a fleeting presence, so that the presence of his sandal in his sanctuary in Khemmis was a sign of his visit.

The Herodotean record of the Scythian genealogical myth was also intended to present to his audience another group of enemies whom the Greeks' Persian enemies had faced in the form of the Scythians and to create a common picture of the Greeks and Scythians who were both invaded by the Persians as a punishment for previous wrongdoing. This narrative itself was placed by Herodotus in the framework of the "primordial struggle" between Asia and Europe which was the Trojan War. Therefore, the narrative of Herodotus crafted a Greek ancestry for the Scythian "comrades" of the Greeks in their struggle against the Persians.

The various Herodotean presentations of the origin of the Scythians, including both versions of the genealogical myth as well as the "Polar Cycle," were intended to present the nomadic lifestyle that enabled the Scythians to defeat the Persians as resulting from an environmental disaster in the form of a northern cold which forced them to resort to a life of wandering and to therefore be recent arrivants in the Pontic Steppe.

The narrative of Hēraklēs wandering through the unfamiliar country of Scythia to search for his horse was itself recorded by Herodutus as a parallel to how the Persian army became lost and exhausted its forces while trying to pursue the Scythians during the Achaemenid invasion of Scythia in 513 BCE. At the same time, the Scythians, who were presented as descendants of Hēraklēs in this story, in consequence were protected by him through his divine power to ward off evil, which was also attested through his epithet of alexikakos (αλεξικακος).

Similarly, Hēraklēs reaching the abode of the Snake-Legged Goddess in the Woodland of Scythia after she abducted his horses in the myth paralleled how the Scythians intentionally drawing the Persians deeper into Scythia by laying deceptive trails.

== Ritual ==
=== Relics ===
The peoples of Scythia believed that Targī̆tavah had left his footprint in the territory of the Tyragetae, in the region of the middle Tyras river, which the local peoples of this area displayed proudly. The location of this footprint was itself held to have a religious signification, since the Tyras river formed the western limit of the Eurasian steppe and its western banks were elevated, due to which the god of that river was worshipped in Scythia.

The inhabitants of the Greek colony of Tyras appear to also have had their own variation of the myth of Hēraklēs passing near their city, which is suggested by the presence of the image of Hēraklēs and bulls representing the cattle of Gēryōn on this city's coins.

=== Shrines ===
==== At Hylaea ====
A Greek language inscription from the later 6th century BC recorded the existence of a shrine at Hylaea which was held in common by both Scythians and Greeks. The shrine at Hylaea was the location of altars to:

- the god of the Borysthenes;
- Targī̆tavah, referred to in the inscription as Hēraklēs;
- the Snake-Legged Goddess, referred to in the inscription as the "Mother of the Gods," because the Greeks identified her with their Mother Goddess Cybele due to her chthonic nature.

The inscription located this shrine in the wooded region of Hylaea, where, according to the Scythian genealogical myth, was located the residence of the Snake-Legged Goddess, and where she and Targī̆tavah became the ancestors of the Scythians; the deities to whom the altars of the shrine were dedicated to were all present in the Scythian genealogical myth. The altars at the shrine of Hylaea were located in open air, and were not placed within any larger structure or building.

The Olbiopolitan Greeks also worshipped Achilles in his form identified with Targī̆tavah at Hylaea.

Women performed rituals at the shrine of Hylaea, and the Scythian prince Anacharsis was killed by his brother, the king Saulius, for having offered sacrifices to the Snake-Legged Goddess at the shrine of Hylaea.

Thus, the Olbia-centricity of the Hellenised variant of the genealogical myth also constituted an origin myth for the cult of Targī̆tavah-Hēraklēs at Hylaea, and the mention of the horses of "Hēraklēs" being stolen by the Snake-Legged Goddess dwelling at Hylaea explained the presence of horses in the rituals of this cult.

==== At Tyras ====
A cult centre might have existed at the site of the footprint of Targī̆tavah-Hēraklēs on the Tyras river.

=== The ritual sleep ===
The ritual sleep was a ceremony conducted at the Holy Ways, where the great bronze cauldron representing the centre of the world was located. During this ceremony, a substitute ritual king would ceremonially sleep in an open air field along with the gold hestiai for a single night, possibly as a symbolical ritual impregnation of the earth. This substitute king would receive as much land as he could ride around in one day: this land belonged to the real king and was given to the substitute king to complete his symbolic identification with the real king, following which he would be allowed to live for one year until he would be sacrificed when the time for the next ritual sleep festival would arrive and a successor of the ritual king was chosen. This ceremony also represented the death and rebirth of the Scythian king.

This festival corresponded to the rājasūya royal consecration ceremony of the Indic peoples, where the borders of the king's realm were determined by the territory around which his horse walked.

During the ritual sleep ceremony, the king of the Royal Scythians performed the duties of a priest, thus acting as a priest-king.

The ceremony of the ritual sleep was the main event of the Scythian calendar, during which the Scythian kings would worship the gold hestiai with rich sacrifices. The ceremony might have been held at the moment of the Scythian calendar corresponding to the fall of the gold objects from the heavens.

== In art ==
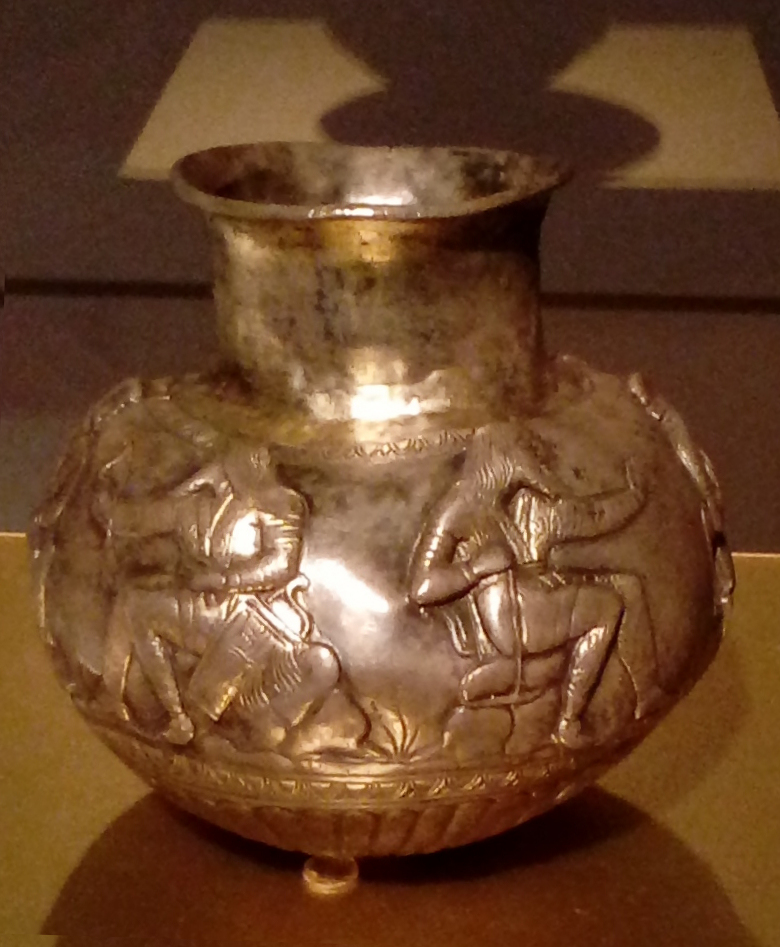
The Voronezh cup.

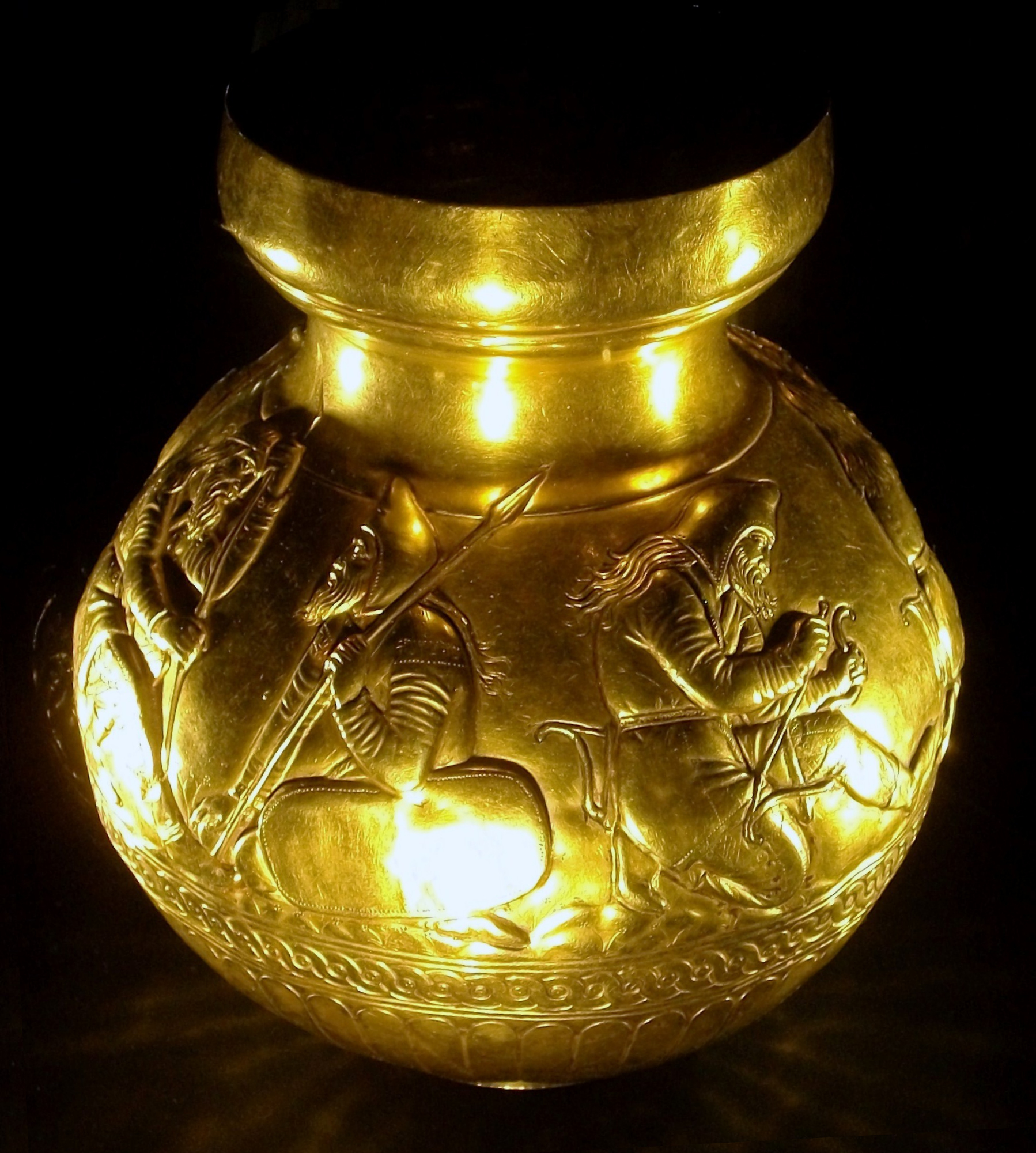
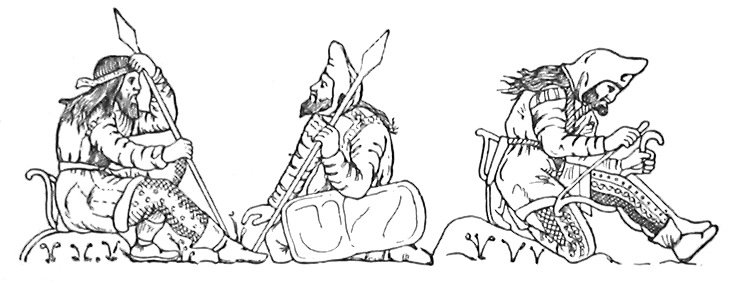
The scene of the Kul-Oba electrum vessel

The Scythian genealogical myth was often featured in Scythian art.

=== The struggle against chaos ===
A Scythian depiction of the combat of Targī̆tavah against the chthonic personification of chaos might have been present on one of the bone plaques decorating a comb from the Haymanova mohyla, which was decorated with the scene of two Scythians fighting a monster with the front-legs of a lion, a scaly body, and a fish- or dragon-like split tail, with the monster's appearance connecting it to the element of water, and therefore to the chthonic realm; one of the Scythians in the scene is depicted as dying in the monster's leonine paws while the second man kills it with a spear.

=== The trial of the sons ===
The narrative where the three sons of Targī̆tavah were tasked to string the bow of their father might have been represented on a silver cup from Voronezh whose surface is decorated with three scenes where Targī̆tavah explains his first son the task, then banishes his second son for failing the task, and finally gives the younger son a bow as reward for fulfilling the task.

Unlike the Greek retelling of the myth, in which "Hēraklēs" returns to Greece and instructs the Snake-Legged Goddess to put their three sons through the trial of the bowstring, these scenes instead represent, in accordance with Scythian traditions of patrilineality, the divine paternal ancestor of the first king, that is Targī̆tavah himself, putting his sons through the trial.

Another representation of the trial of the sons of Targī̆tavah might have decorated an electrum vessel from the Kul-Oba kurgan, where Targī̆tavah is represented wearing a Greek-type diadēma, and his two elder sons who had failed the task of the bowstring are depicted being healed while the third son is shown stringing the bow.

=== Scythian coins ===
Coins of the Scythian king Eminakes struck at Pontic Olbia were decorated on their reverse with images of Targī̆tavah, who was Scythian kings' personal symbol, and who was depicted on the coins as the Greek Hēraklēs wearing his lion-skin, and stringing a bow while his knee is bent. Unlike other Greek coins in which Hēraklēs is depicted as an archer, his posture in the coins of Eminakes is similar to that of Targī̆tavah's son stringing the bow from the Kul-Oba vessel.

Coins of the later Scythian king Ateas were struck with the image of the head of Hēraklēs wearing a lion-shaped helmet. These coins primarily copied Macedonian ones, and were meant to signal the Scythian kingdom as being an equal of the Macedonian kingdom of Philip II, although the choice of the head of Hēraklēs was also meant to emphasise Ateas's descent from Hēraklēs, who was assimilated to Targī̆tavah.

== Comparative mythology ==
=== Indo-Iranic parallels ===
==== Other Iranic parallels ====
Several parallels to the Scythian genealogical myth existed in various Iranic traditions.

===== Zoroastrian parallels =====
====== Social classes and Zoroastrian kingship ======
In the Avesta, the three sons of Zarathustra are assigned the roles of the progenitors of the three social classes, with the eldest son being the head priest, the second son being an agriculturist, and the third son being a warrior.

In another passage of the Avesta where Zarathustra appears in relation to the three social classes, Zarathustra bestows upon Vištāspa the blessing that he would have ten sons, of whom three would be priests, three would be warriors, and three would be farmer-agriculturists, and one who would be like Vištāspa himself.

The concept of the king encompassing and transcending the social classes is present in the Zoroastrian tradition, with the Vištāsp Yašt and the Āfrīn-i Payğāmbar Zarduxšt of the Avesta explicitly propounding this notion of kingship, which was reiterated by the 9th century AD Zoroastrian scholar Zādspram in his writings.

The blessing bestowed by Zarathustra to Vištāspa, according to which Vištāspa would have ten sons, of whom three would be priests, three would be warriors, three would be farmers, and the tenth would be like Vištāspa, was derived from the Iranic notion of the three sons as the progenitor of the three social classes, while the tenth son who was to be like Vištāspa represented the king within whom the functions of these three social classes were united.

Paralleled the role of the belt with a cup attached to it in establishing Skythēs's role as the supreme priest, Zarathustra was believed to have first established the practise wearing of the kustīg belt which adherents of Zoroastrianism had to start wearing from a young age.

====== Haošiiaŋha and his heirs ======
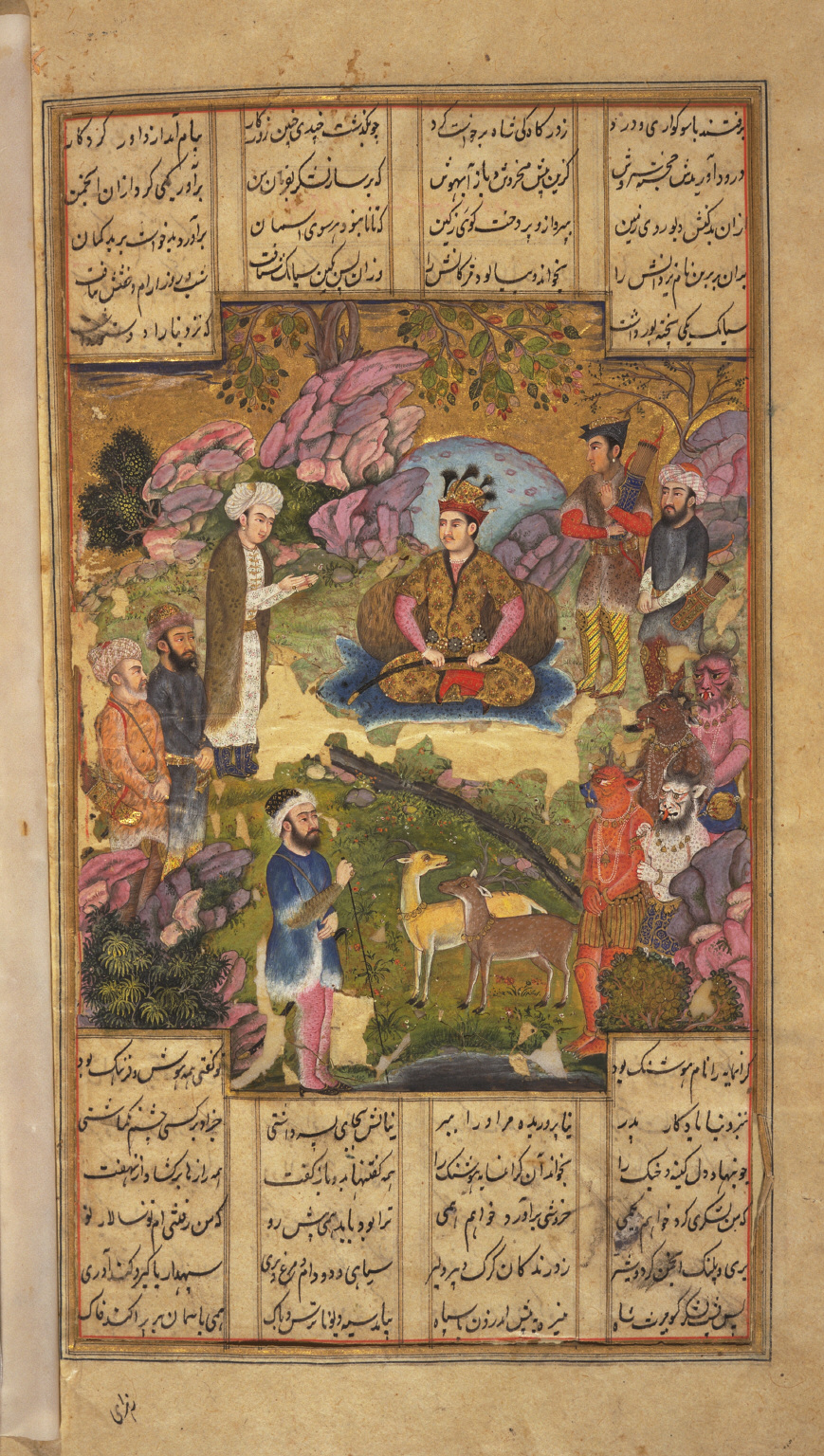
Hōšang (Haošiiaŋha) being tasked by his grandfather to defeat demons. Safavid-era illustration.

The name Paralatai was a Greek reflection of the Scythian name Paralāta, which was a cognate of the Avestan title Paraδāta (𐬞𐬀𐬭𐬀𐬜𐬁𐬙𐬀), which means "first created." In the Avesta, Haošiiaŋha was the first king and the ancestor of the warrior class, that is of the military aristocracy of which the kings were members, and the title Paralāta was assigned in Zoroastrian literature to the first king, Haošiiaŋha, and to his descendants and successors, the Pishdadian dynasty.

In Avestan mythology, Haošiiaŋha Paraδāta held the role of the warrior-king who fought against non-Iranic "barbarians" and had both human and demonic enemies, and also laid the foundations of royal power and of sovereignty.

Haošiiaŋha's son Taxma Urupi, who also bore the title of Paraδāta, meanwhile corresponded to the priest-king, being opposed to the same enemies of Haošiiaŋha as well as to sorcerers, and he managed to use magic to turn Aŋra Ma^{i}niiu into his horse which he rode for thirty years. Taxma Urupi in Avestan mythology also curbed idolatry and promoted the worship of Ahura Mazdā, and was also credited with inventing writing, which were all attributes of a priest-king, thus making him the equivalent of Lipoxais.

Taxma Urupi's successor to the kingship, Yima, meanwhile held the role of a "prosperous king," which corresponded to Arpoxais's role as the progenitor of the farmer class. Taxma Urupi's creation of the underground enclosure, the vara, connected him to the lower world, which also signalled his association with the role of the progenitor of the farmer class. Yima's epithet of xšaēta (𐬑𐬱𐬀𐬉𐬙𐬀), meaning "brilliant" and "shining" was a sign of his proximity to the Sun and the Moon due to his possession of the x^{v}ar^{ə}nah in his capacity of being king.

A myth similar to that of the golden objects falling from the sky was also present in the Avesta, where Ahura Mazdā offered to Yima a suβrā (either a pick or a shepherd's flute) and an aštrā (a cattle goad), both made of gold, which Yima used on the earth to increase the size of its part which was inhabitable.

The role of Arpoxais as the progenitor of the farmer class finds another parallel in the Zoroastrian tradition, where Haošiiaŋha's brother Vaēgerēδ was the creator of agriculture and the ancestor of the farmer class.

====== Θrita ======
In the Hōm Yašt of the Avesta, the hero Θrita was the third mortal man to have prepared the sacred haoma drink. Θrita in turn had two sons, of whom Urvāxšaya was a religious mentor as well as a judge and a lawgiver, while Kərəsāspa was a famous heroic warrior who slew a horned dragon.

===== The x^{v}ar^{ə}nah =====
====== The x^{v}ar^{ə}nah and kingship ======
Ahura Mazdā offered to Yima the suβrā and aštrā which Yima used on the earth to increase the inhabitable part of the Earth in the Vendīdād, and Yima used his x^{v}ar^{ə}nah to perform this task the Dēnkard, thus identifying the x^{v}ar^{ə}nah with the suβrā and aštrā. This story paralleled the acquisition of the hestiai of Tabiti by Kolaxais, who thus became the possessor of the fārnā and of its physical symbols.

The x^{v}ar^{ə}nah was believed to follow the legitimate king and escape from usurpers, but it was also believed to leave the legitimate king and pass over to a better candidate should he become unjust and violate the laws. Thus, in the Avesta, when Yima started to believe lies, his x^{v}ar^{ə}nah left him three times in three parts: one part took on the form of the Vārᵊγna bird to pass onto the god Mithra, one part passed onto the prince Θraētaona, who became king, and the third part passed onto Θrita's son, the hero Kərəsāspa, who became a dragon-slaying hero just as Θraētaona had previously been, as a result of which Yima lost the kingship and was succeeded by Θraētaona.

The narrative of the x^{v}ar^{ə}nah leaving the legitimate king after corruption is present in the Dēnkard, where the king Kāy Us lost his x^{v}ar^{ə}nah after attempting to conquer the heavens.

In the Greater Bundahišn, Nōtargā attempted to steal the x^{v}ar^{ə}nah of Frētōn by using witchcraft to place it inside a cow whose milk he gave to his three sons to drink. The x^{v}ar^{ə}nah rejected each of the sons, and instead passed into one of Nōtargā's daughters, who later gave birth to Kay Apīveh, who possessed the x^{v}ar^{ə}nah from birth and became the second Kayanian king and the true founder of the Kayanian dynasty, after which his x^{v}ar^{ə}nah passed on to his heirs. Although this myth is not directly connected to the Scythian genealogical myth, this narrative of the x^{v}ar^{ə}nah choosing its possessor is nevertheless similar to how the hestiai of Tabiti rejected Lipoxais and Arpoxais, and instead chose Kolaxais to become their possessor.

====== The x^{v}ar^{ə}nah and the social classes ======
Like among the Scythians, the x^{v}ar^{ə}nah in Zoroastrianism was also tripartite, which is reflected in a myth recorded by Zādspram, according to which humans at the time of Hōšang (Haošiiaŋha) - although the Bundahišn sets the story during the time of Taxmurup (Taxma Urupi) - were able to travel from one region of the earth to another on the back of the gigantic bull Srisōk. However, the sacred fire on the back of Srisōk fell into the sea and separated into three Zoroastrian Sacred Fires which possessed the x^{v}ar^{ə}nah and were established at three sites. These Three Fires were:

- Ādur Farnbāg, which was dedicated to the priestly class;
- Ādur Gušnasp, which was dedicated to the warrior class;
- Ādur Burzēn-Mihr, which was dedicated to the farmer class.

Unlike the Scythian fārnā, the three components of the x^{v}ar^{ə}nah of the Sasanian period were kept separately due to a later Zoroastrian eschatological notion recorded in the Dēnkard, according to which the union of the Fire of the Priests and the Fire of the Warriors was capable of destroying evil, preserve creation, and the renewal of existence. Therefore, since evil still existed in the world, the reunification had to happen in the end times.

Although the Three Fires were located in physically separate spots, they were nevertheless all present within the same kingdom ruled by the same king, due to which the Sasanian kings possessed all three components of the x^{v}ar^{ə}nah.

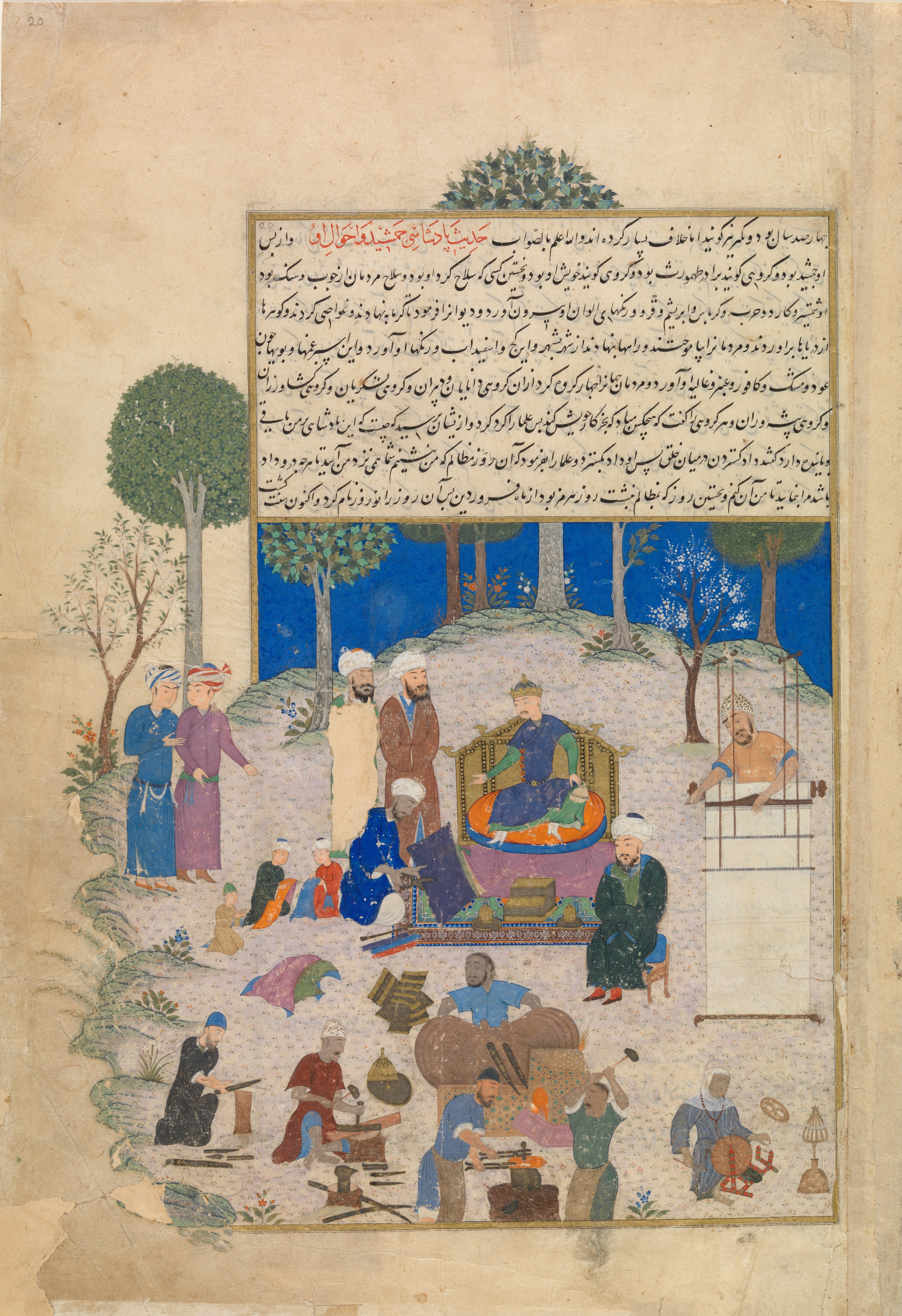
Yima teaches the crafts to humanity. Mediaeval-era illustration.

Although Yima is depicted in later Zoroastrian literature as possessing only two physical manifestations of the x^{v}ar^{ə}nah, the suβrā and aštrā, in the Bundahišn, he used three fires to perform all his tasks during his reign, with these fires corresponding to the royal x^{v}ar^{ə}nah and to the three Scythian hestiai possessed by Kolaxais. The reference to the "three fires" suggests that in the earlier variants of the myth, Yima was a perfect king who owned an object representing the priestly function in addition to the suβrā and aštrā, thus possessing the sacred objects which represented the three aspects of kingship and the three social classes, thus corresponding exactly to the three objects which were in the possession of Kolaxais in the Scythian genealogical myth.

The discrepancy between Yima possessing three sacred objects in the earlier form of the myth and only two in the later variant is due to a later Zoroastrian development, recorded in the narrative from the Vendīdād, where Ahura Mazdā initially offered to Yima to study and preserve the Good Religion, which Yima refused. Ahura Mazdā then offered kingship of the whole world to Yima, and he accepted and therefore received the suβrā and aštrā, which are described in the text of the Vendīdād as the xšaθra, meaning "royal powers," and which respectively represent the farmer and warrior functions. Since Yima refused to preserve religion, he did not possess the third physical manifestation of the x^{v}ar^{ə}nah representing the priestly class, which was to be owned by Zarathustra, hence why the objects possessed by Yima became reduced to two in later Zoroastrian myth.

These differences resulted from innovations by the priestly class to discredit the claims of the kings of being the divine agents, and which were canonised in the myth of Yima believing the lies. According to this myth, Yima performed faultless sacrifices which ensured that paradical conditions on prevailed on Earth during his thousand-year rule which were marked by perfect climate, the unity of all beings under his rule, the powerlessness of demons, and the absence of death, old age, hunger, and thirst. However, Yima then listened to the lies and claimed that he was the one who had created all the spiritual and material beings, after which he lost divine favour and his x^{v}ar^{ə}nah left him, and his perfection and Golden Age ended and were replaced by the present human world where death, disease, wars, demons, lying kings, and propaganda prevailed. This state of trouble could only be ended by the establishment of the Good Religion, which was founded by Zarathustra, who founded priestly institutions, teachings, practices, and texts; unlike other ancient Iranic traditions which held that the king was the divinely-ordained agent who had to restore the primordial paradise, in the Zoroastrian tradition, kings caused disasters for themselves as well as their people and the world because they would inevitably lie, thus making kings themselves the responsibles for the end of this paradisal state.

Therefore, Yima's kingship in later Zoroastrian literature was incomplete, since he united within himself the warrior and farmer functions, but not the priestly one, hence why Yima is described in Zoroastrian literature as possessing the full royal x^{v}ar^{ə}nah but none of the religious x^{v}ar^{ə}nah, while Zarathustra possessed the full religious x^{v}ar^{ə}nah but none of the royal x^{v}ar^{ə}nah.

However, in some myths relating to Yima, he possessed a belt, which was a symbol of the priestly class, and Yima's belt was even said to be identical to the Zoroastrian religion in some texts, thus allowing him to use the belt to render Ahriman (the Avestan Aŋra Ma^{i}niiu) and his demons powerless. This paralleled the role of the belt with a cup attached to it in establishing Skythēs's role as the supreme priest.

According to the Dēnkard, Yima's x^{v}ar^{ə}nah passed on to:

- Frētōn (the Avestan Θraētaona), who received the farmers' part of the x^{v}ar^{ə}nah;
- Sāmān Karsāsp (the Avestan Kərəsāspa), who received the warriors' part of the x^{v}ar^{ə}nah;
- Ošnar, a sage who received the priests' part of the x^{v}ar^{ə}nah.

In the Yašt 19 of the Avesta, Ahura Mazdā told Zarathustra that whoever would be able to capture the x^{v}ar^{ə}nah that once belonged to Yima, which was hidden in the Vo^{u}rukaša ocean, would obtain three boons, consisting of the boon of the priests, the boon of well-being and wealth, and the boon of victory with which he would be able to destroy all enemies. These three parts were reunited in the x^{v}ar^{ə}nah of the kings of the Kayanian dynasty.

In both the Dēnkard's and the Yašt 19's narratives, the three parts of Yima's x^{v}ar^{ə}nah are listed in the same order as the sons of Targī̆tavah, with the first part corresponding to the priests, the second part to the farmers, and the third part to the warriors.

===== The Ayādgār-ī Jāmāspīg =====
In the Zoroastrian eschatological text, the Ayādgār-ī Jāmāspīg, the hero Ferēdūn had three sons, who each represented the social classes, were also the ancestors of the three major populations of the known world:

- the eldest, Salm, was the ancestor of the producer class, and became the ruler of Rome;
- the second, Tōz, was the ancestor of the warrior-aristocracy, and became the ruler of Turkestan and the desert;
- the third, Ēriz, was the ancestor of the priesthood, and became the ruler of Iran and India.

This variant of the myth had, however, undergone some modifications proper to Zoroastrianism, so that the dominant class descended from the youngest son of Ferēdūn was that of the priests rather than the warrior aristocracy. Some aspects of the original version of the myth were nevertheless still present, so that Ferēdūn still gave to Ēriz the x^{v}ar^{ə}nah, which was normally an attribute of the kings and of the warrior aristocracy; and the power of Ēriz it itself described in the Ayādgār-ī Jāmāspīg as consisting of xvatāyīh u pātexšāhīh, that is of royalty and rulership. In the Dēnkard, Ēriz instead received from his father the vāxš (𐬬𐬁𐬑𐬱), that is speech, due to the replacement of the original royal attributes of Ēriz by priestly ones.

The roles of the sons of Ferēdūn as the ancestors of three peoples parallel the second version of the Scythian genealogical myth recorded by Herodotus of Halicarnassus, where the sons of "Hēraklēs" each became the ancestors of a Scythic tribe.

====== The sons of Mihr-Narseh ======
In the 5th century AD, the Sasanid wuzurg framadār Mihr-Narseh had his three sons appointed to important positions at the head of the three estates of Persian society:

- the eldest son was named the hērbadān hērbad, which was the second highest position within the clerical hierarchy;
- the second son was appointed as the vāstryōšān-sālār, that is the head of the agriculturists, who was also the minister in charge of taxation and finance;
- the third son became the artēštārān-sālār, that is the head of the warriors, and the grand marshal.

The order of the respective professions of the sons of Mihr-Narseh corresponded to the functions of the sons of both Zarathustra and Targī̆tavah, and Mihr-Narseh might have intentionally chosen this order of professions to emulate Zoroaster himself or one of the ancient pious kings of Zoroastrian mythology.

Mihr-Narseh also built four fire temples near his home town, with one being for himself and corresponding to the king's personal fire, which was also the prime fire of the empire, and the other three corresponding to each of his sons and which also corresponded to the three Great Fires of the Sasanid Empire.

====== The primordial unity ======
The theme of the primordial unity of creation was also present in the Zoroastrian cosmogenetic myth, where Ahura Mazdā created the Sky, Water, Earth, Plant, Animal, and Human. The first Plant, Animal, and Human each included within their bodies all of the good qualities which were present in the various plants, animals, and humans who later came into existence, so that this state of primordial perfection was characterised by integrity of body and spirit, due to which these original beings were free of vice, disease, suffering and death.

This primordial perfection was lost when Aŋra Ma^{i}niiu attacked the creations of Ahura Mazdā and killed the primordial plant, the primordial animal, and the primordial human in this specific order. However, the death of these primordial beings was not their end, and they instead fragmented into smaller parts which then became the many types of plants, animals, and humans, all of which contained both some good and some evil, and the ability to reproduce, which was itself the replacement of immortality by the perpetuation of the species. Thus, the original perfection was replaced by a combination of good and evil, and the shattered primordial unity became a multiplicity, with these changes creating the possibility for the arising of confusion and conflict.

Therefore, Ahura Mazdā expected that one day Aŋra Ma^{i}niiu would be vanquished, and the primordial perfection would be restored, which can only be accomplished by the suppression of liars, evil-doers, and all destructive forces. To achieve this, the Zoroastrian tradition made Zarathustra the one chosen by Ahura Mazdā to help righteous humans fight Aŋra Ma^{i}niiu by cultivating good thoughts, good words, and good deeds, the latter of which included ritual as well as ethical action. Therefore, Zoroastrianism considers unity and harmony as achievable by performing sacrifice, purification, and recitation of sacred hymns, due to which it places priests as the ones in charge of restoring the primordial perfection.

Thus, the goal of the priests in the Zoroastrian religion was to restore the primordial paradise which existed at the beginning of creation.

This theme is repeated in the myth of Yima, where the paradisal state of the world characterised by abundance, contentment, immortality and perfect peace under his rule corresponds to the primordial unity and perfection. However, once Yima believed the lie, the primordial unity underwent fragmentation, starting when he lost his x^{v}ar^{ə}nah, which split into three, after which Yima himself was eventually killed by demons and his body was dismembered, and the paradisal Golden Age ended and was replaced by a state of multiplicity, mixture of good and evil, and trouble in the form of the present world dominated by death, disease, wars, demons, and lying kings.

According to the Zoroastrian religion, the solution to these troubles was the establishment of the Good Religion by the divinely-ordained Zarathustra, who in consequence founded priestly institutions, teachings, practices, and texts.

===== Persian parallels =====
====== The primordial unity ======
The theme of the promordial unity was also present among the religion of the ancient Persians, and was often mentioned in Achaemenid royal inscriptions, in which the kings held Ahura Mazda as the source of all creation who brought Heaven, Earth, humanity, and happiness into existence. In these inscriptions, Heaven, Earth, humanity and happiness were all referred to in the singular to denote the state of primordial harmony and unity which initially existed, and during which humanity lived in absolute bliss characterised by peace, calm, and freedom from all conflict.

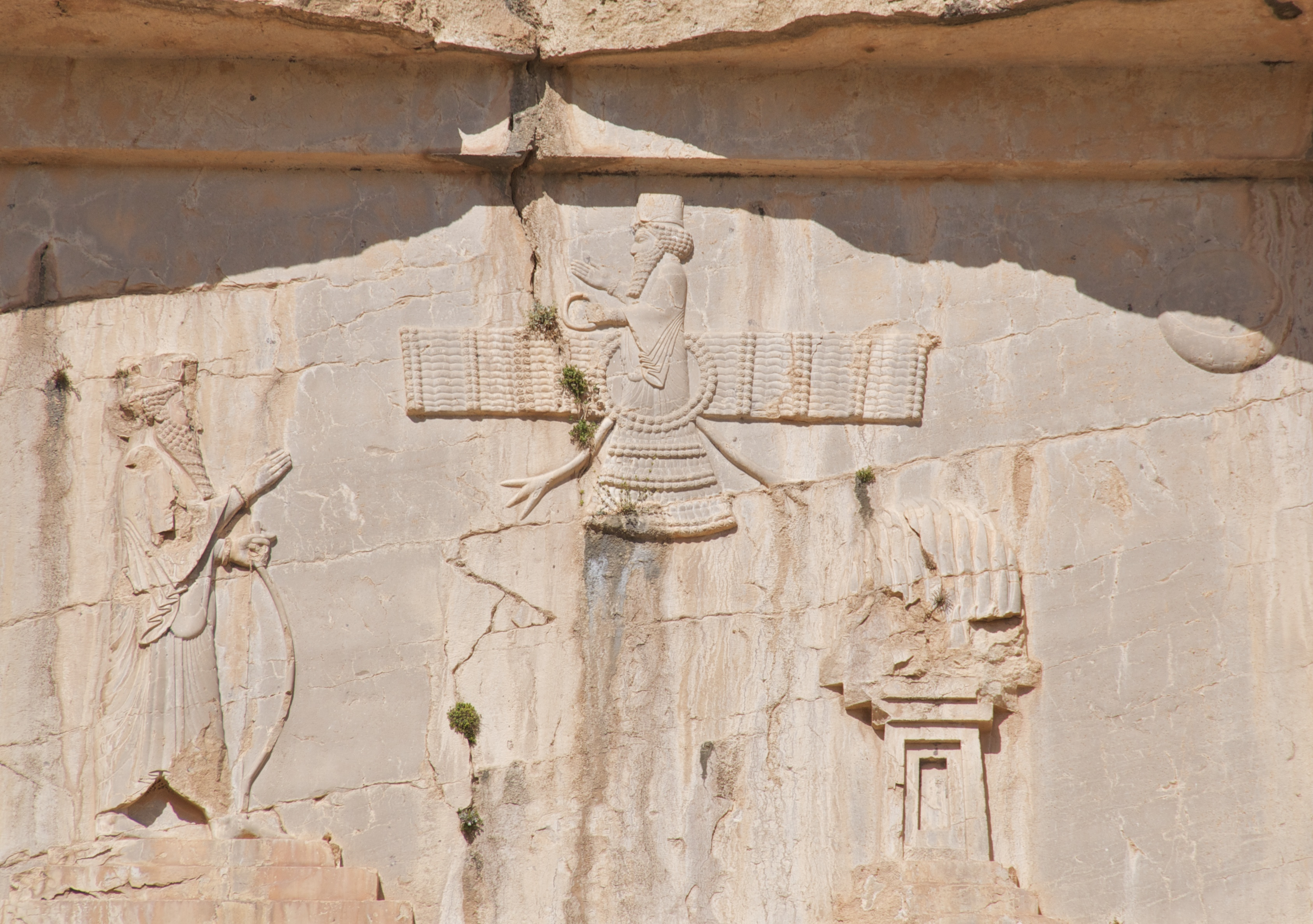
Relief of the Achaemenid king Xerxes I in front of a fire altar with a fravarti or farnah above them.

This primordial perfection was lost when the Lie entered existence and shattered unity, and spread. Finally, according to the Achaemenid inscriptions, this crisis was resolved when Ahura Mazda made Darius I king in an act of divine creation. Within this scheme, Darius presented himself as representing the institution of ideal kingship who led the divinely-ordained struggle ensure that good prevails over evil, truth prevails over falsehood, and unity prevails over multiplicity, hence why Darius's inscriptions ended by naming him as "one king over many, one commander over many" (Old Persian: 𐎠𐎡𐎺𐎶 𐏐 𐎱𐎽𐎢𐎴𐎠𐎶 𐏐 𐎧𐏁𐎠𐎹𐎰𐎡𐎹𐎶 𐏐 𐎠𐎡𐎺𐎶 𐏐 𐎱𐎽𐎢𐎴𐎠𐎶 𐏐 𐎳𐎼𐎶𐎠𐎫𐎠𐎼𐎶, romanized: aivam parūnām xšāyaθiyam, aivam parunām framātāram).

In one of Darius's inscriptions from Susa, this cosmogenetic narrative is repeated, with Ahura Mazda being described as creating a "wonder," which is also the term used to refer to the palace that Darius had built in Susa: multiple other inscriptions from Susa describe Darius as having the most skilled artisans from all of the Achaemenid Empire's provinces work the most precious materials of their respective homelands to build the palace, which itself represented a microcosmic wonder which grandiosely restored the perfect unity of creation. In Darius's Susa inscription, his actions are referred to in such a way that he parallels Ahura Mazda, thus portraying Darius as the Creator God himself, rather than as a figure of salvation created by the Creator God.

Therefore, within the Achaemenid Persian religion, like in Zoroastrianism, the primordial perfection had to be restored through the suppression of liars, evil-doers, and all destructive forces. However, in the Achaemenid tradition, it was the king who was the agent chosen by Ahura Mazda to restore the primordial perfection by defeating rebels and enemies, proclaiming the truth, imposing the law, uniting all peoples under his rule, and building palaces and gardens where perfect happiness would re-emerge and radiate through creation.

Thus, the goal of the kings in the Achaemenid religion was to restore the primordial paradise which existed at the beginning of creation.

====== The three brothers ======
The myth of an ancient and pious king whose three sons were the progenitors of the three social classes appears to have existed among the Persians up till the Sasanian period in the 5th century AD.

====== The king and the social classes ======
The Achaemenid kings would wear the peasant clothes of their empire's founder, Cyrus II, and eat a peasant's meal before being consecrated by the priests, being a ritual whereby the king, who originated among the warrior-aristocracy, also became a member of the producer class. This suggests that the Indo-Iranic concept of the king originating among the warrior-aristocracy and then ritually becoming a member of the priestly and farmer classes, thus encompassing the three social functions and representing all the classes by being himself the incarnation of society.

In a prayer from Persepolis, the Achaemenid king Darius I asked Ahura Mazda to protect his kingdom from ills relating to the three social functions, and consisting of hostile armies (representing the warrior function), bad harvests (representing the producer function), and lies (representing the religious aspect). The king thus protected his realm from these three evils because he was himself held to be the good warrior, the protector of the land and of the peasants, and the just king, which were often mentioned virtues in Achaemenid royal inscriptions.

The Achaemenid king Xerxes I performed a sacrifice to the Sun-god on the shores of the Hellespont where, after having poured a libation, he threw in the sea a cup representing the priestly class, the golden kratēr which might have represented the farmer class, and an akīnakēs which represented the warrior class. Alternatively, the cup and the kratēr might both have represented the priestly class while the akīnakēs still represented the warrior classes, which parallels the second version of the Scythian genealogical myth whereby only the priests and the warriors were represented by objects.

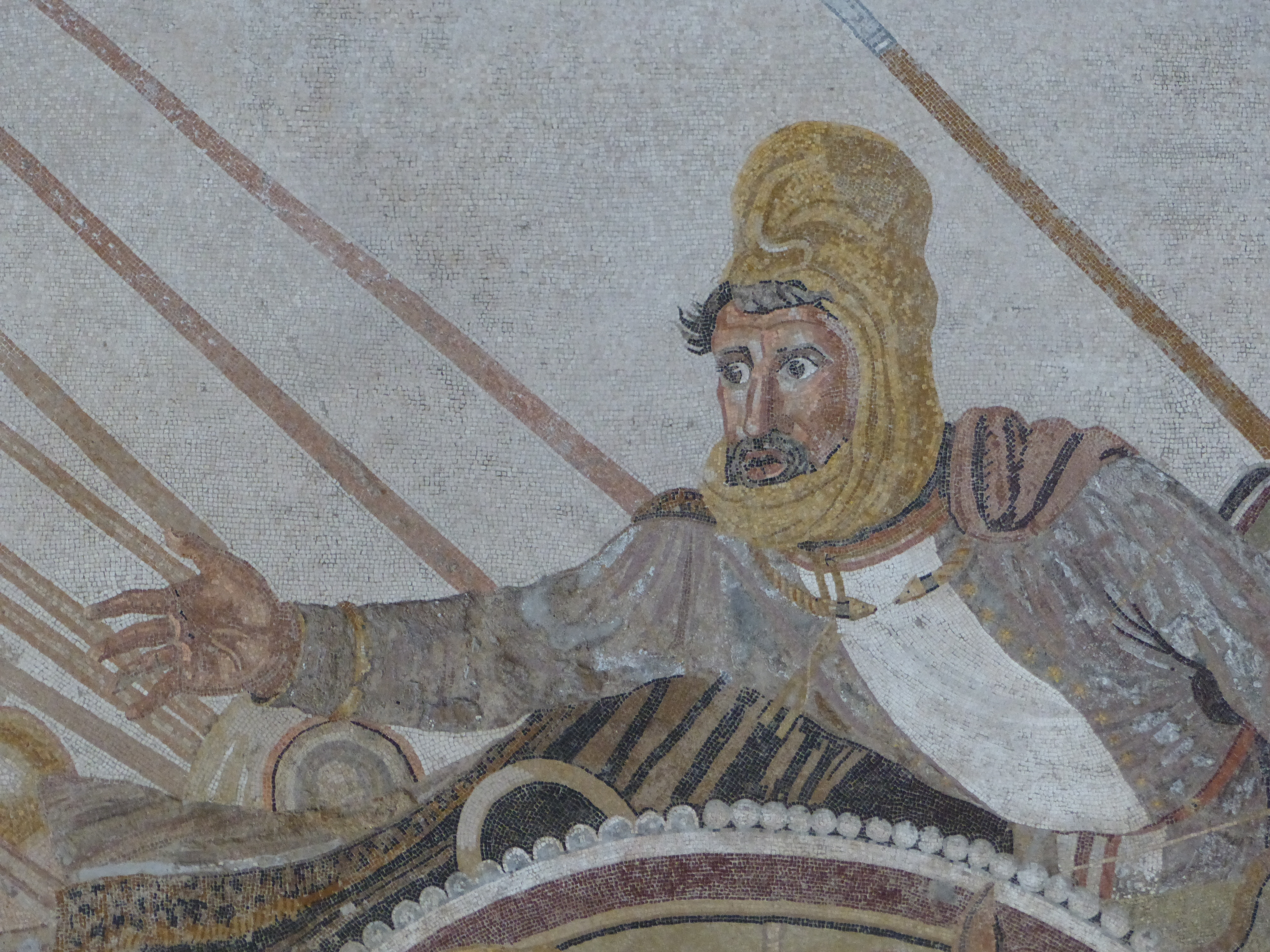
The Achaemenid king Darius III wearing his ceremonial costume representing the unification of the social classes within his figure. Detail of an ancient Roman floor mosaic from the House of the Faun in Pompeii, Italy.

The last Achaemenid king, Darius III, wore a ceremonial dress which was decorated with gold and precious stones, and whose colours were white for the priestly class, purple for the warrior class (the gold and the precious stones also represented this class), and dark blue or green for the farmer class. The colour schema of this ceremonial dress represented the unification of the three social classes within the figure of the king.

The golden objects of the Scythian genealogical myth, that is the hestiai of Tabiti, as attested by their fiery nature, were the fires of the three classes of Scythian society, which had an equivalent in later Sasanid Persia, where the Three Sacred Great Fires of Zoroastrianism were considered as each being sacred to one social class, with the triunity of both the Scythian hestiai and the Sasanian Great Fires representing the concept of fire, represented in the Scythian religion by Tabiti, being the primeval and all-encompassing element permeating the world and being present throughout it.

During the Sasanid period, the mythical sēnmurw, a composite creature whose anatomy consists of parts of a bird, a dog, and a fish, had been used as a symbol of royalty because the constituent parts of its body meant that it united within itself the three social classes which correspond to the three - celestial, earthly, chthonic - layers of the world in Iranic cosmology, similarly to how the Iranic kings encompassed within themselves and represented these three classes.

====== The farnah ======
The notion of the farnah transforming the king into a divine figure and a type of deity who was sometimes seen as the brother of the Sun and the Moon was also present among the pre-Islamic Persians. Instances of this concept include Herodotus's claim that Darius I was chosen to be king when his horse was the first to neigh at sunrise, and the Kārnāmag-ī Ardašīr-ī Pābagān's record that Pābag's first dream, in which the Sun shining from the head of Sāsān and illuminating the whole world, was a sign that Ardašīr I would become king. Various Persian kings also held solar titles, and, like the Massagetae, the Persians also sacrificed horses to the Sun-god, with such sacrifices having been performed monthly at the tomb of Cyrus II, signalling that he had been assimilated to the Sun.

Due to the Iranic belief of gold being a material representation of farnah, Achaemenid kings kept large numbers of gold objects in their palaces which would help them preserve their farnah.

Because the farnah was believed to be dangerous due to its solar nature, accidentally seeing the king's farnah was considered capable of blinding or even killing whoever accidentally saw it. The Persian practice of proskynēsis, whereby all who met the Achaemenid king had to prostrate before him and had to wait for his permission to rise up again, might have developed as a way to prevent ordinary humans from losing their eyesight or lives by accidentally seeing the royal farnah.

As a result of the perceived dangerous nature of the royal farnah, Achaemenid kings were not supposed to come in direct contact with ordinary people. Therefore, as among the Scythians, all interactions between members of the ordinary population and the king had to be made through special intermediates appointed by the king himself.

During the Sasanian Empire, those who obtained audiences with the king had to cover their mouths with a white cloth called a padām (𐮎𐮃𐮀𐮋), which was also worn by Zoroastrian priests, in both cases with the aim of preventing the human breath from polluting the sacred fire, which in the temples were the physical fires burning in them, and for the king was his farnah. The king's farnah (called xwarrah was thus assimilated with the burning fire.

According to the Kārnāmag-ī Ardašīr-ī Pābagān, in Pābag's third dream, he saw the Three Sacred Fires, that is Ādur Farnbāg, Ādur Gušnasp, and Ādur Burzēn-Mihr, burning inside the house of Sāsān and illuminating the whole world, which was a sign that a descendant of Sāsān would acquire kingship. This dream also represented the king as the ruler of the three social classes, due to which their corresponding Three Fires which constituted the xwarrah in Middle Persian) belonged to him. The xwarrah among Persians thus was also tripartite.

The text of the Kārnāmag-ī Ardašīr-ī Pābagān presented Ardašīr I as being the legitimate king through his possession of the Three Sacred Fires, and Ardašīr I he had a fourth sacred fire, called the Warahrān Fire, consecrated during his coronation. This was a royal fire which represented the reign of Ardašīr I and was extinguished at his death, after which a new royal fire was consecrated by each Sasanian king. This royal fire represented the unity of the royal xwarrah and the union of the three social classes within the king.

This concept was later recorded by Zādspram, according to whom Warahrān Fire was the abode of the royal xwarrah. This view is also present in Bundahišn, according to which the Three Sacred Fires represented the one body of the Warahrān Fire and were contained in it. The Warahrān Fire thus encompassed the Three Fires of the three social classes and was the incarnation of the royal xwarrah, while the Three Fires were the incarnations of its constituent parts.

In a legend recorded by al-Bīrūnī, the Sasanian king Peroz I went to perform devotions in one of the most important Fire Temples, named Ādur-Xwarrah, where he embraced with his arms the fire of the temple in the same way that friends did when greeting each other, and the fire reached his beard but did not burn him. According to this legend, the king not burnt because he was himself as an emanation of the sacred fire.

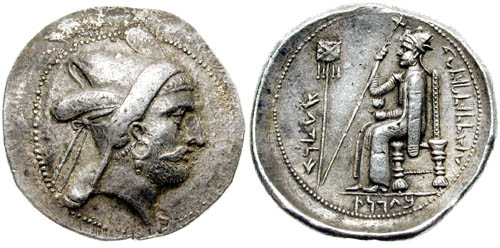
The Derafš-e Kāvīān on the coin (right) of the Frataraka Bagadates I of Persis during the Seleucid period

The Persian imperial banner, known in Modern Persian as the Derafš-e Kāvīān (درفش کاویانی, meaning "standard of the kings"), had been used from Achaemenid times till the end of the Sasanian empire as the physical representation of the kings' xwarrah. The identification of the Derafš-e Kāvīān with the xwarrah is confirmed in the Vendīdād, where the x^{v}ar^{ə}nah/farnah was identified with the gods' standard borne by Vər^{ə}θraγna. The Persians believed that the Derafš-e Kāvīān initially belonged to Θraētaona/Ferēdūn, who bore it during his struggle against Dahāg, and that Ferēdūn emerged victorious thanks to the banner, after which it was inherited successively by his descendants, the Persian kings, who believed that it would ensure their victory in war.

====== The Šāhnāme ======
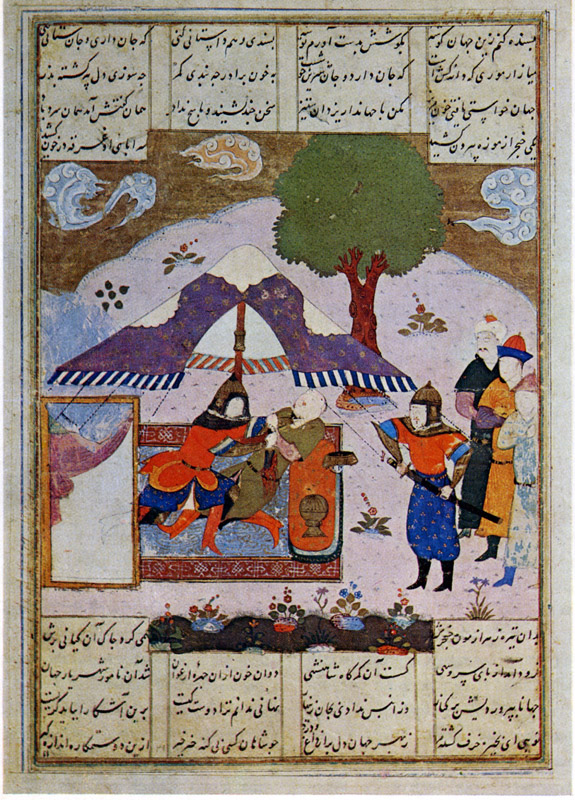
The murder of Īraj by his elder brothers Salm and Tur. Mediaeval-era illustration.

The legend of the three sons of was also preserved in the Šāhnāme, although its social aspect is less obvious, but not fully lost either. The Scythian genealogical myth's narrative of Kolaxais dividing his kingdom among his three sons, who in turn became the ancestors of the different Scythic tribes exhibits clear textual and narrative parallels in the Persian Šāhnāme, with the story of the descendant of Hōšang (Haošiiaŋha), Ferēdūn, and the latter's three sons – Salm, Tūr, and Īraj – from the Šāhnāme.

The narrative of the murder of Kolaxais by his elder brothers fits the common motif of the competition between three brothers in which the youngest is victorious and is then murdered by his elder brothers. This motif is also present in the Šāhnāme, where Ferēdūn tested his three sons, with the youngest, Īraj winning the test, after which Ferēdūn partitioned his kingdom among his sons and giving the best part to Īraj, who was then murdered by his jealous elder brothers.

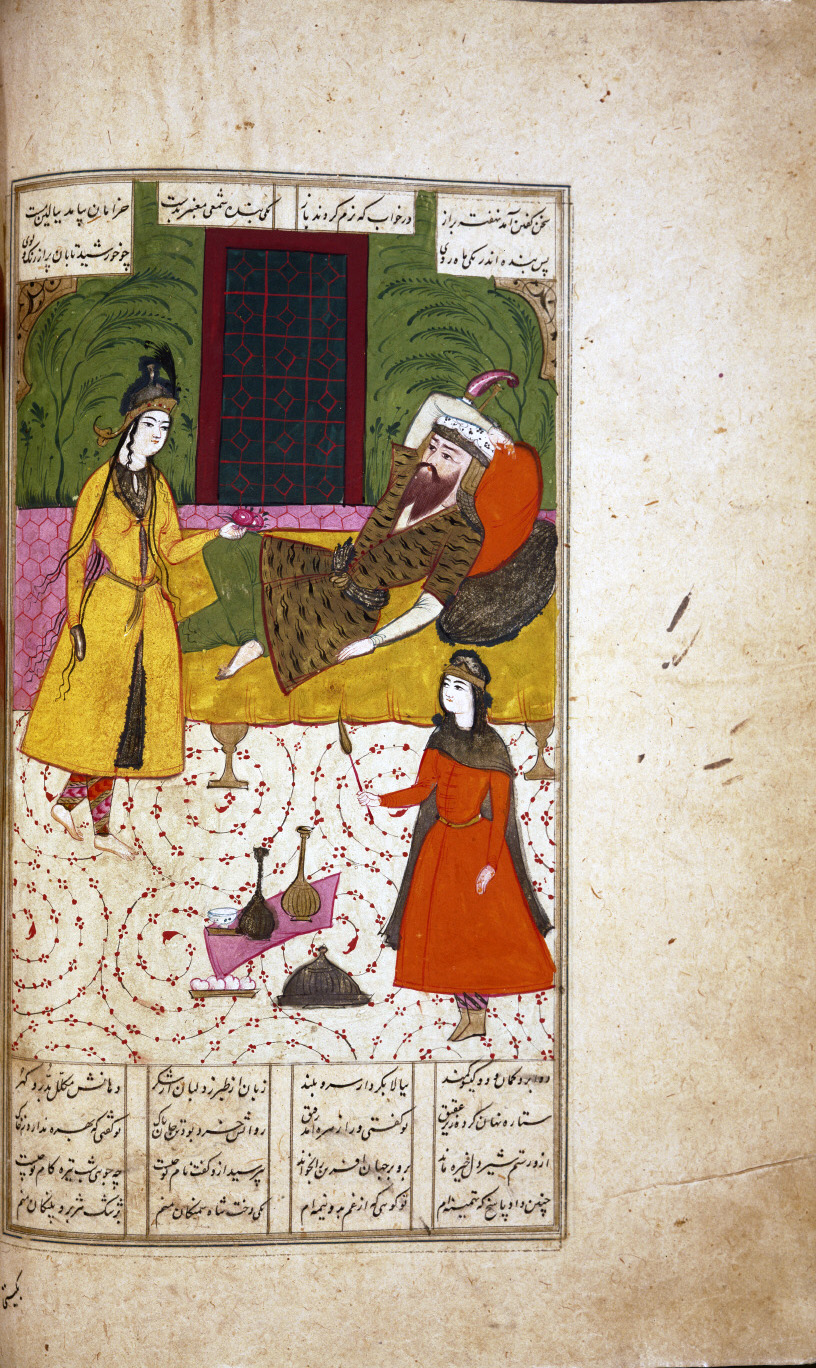
Tahmīna visiting Rostam in his sleep. Safavid era illustration.

Another story from the Šāhnāme with which the Scythian genealogical myth exhibits textual and narrative parallels is that of Īraj's descendant, Rostam, who went looking for his horses which he had lost during his sleep. When looking for his, Rostam arrived at the palace of the king of Samangan, and in the night he was visited by the king's daughter, Tahmīna, who had stolen his horses, and who asked him in marriage. Rostam accepted Tahmīna's proposal and had a son with her, but Rostam had to leave Tahmīna after the marriage ceremony, although before departing he gave her a jewel from his bow as a symbol of future child.

The parallels between this Persian myth and the second version of the Scythian genealogical myth recorded by Herodotus of Halicarnassus thus attest that the latter myth was of a typically Iranic origin, or alternatively that the Šāhnāme's author, Ferdowsī, had read the second version of the Scythian genealogical myth as recorded by Herodotus.

In the Šāhnāme, the Sasanian king Ardašīr I's farr (فر), that is his farnah/x^{v}ar^{ə}nah, transformed itself into a sēnmurw, whose composite nature consisting of parts of a bird, a dog, and a fish, meant that it united within itself the three social classes which correspond to the three - celestial, earthly, chthonic - layers of the world in Iranic cosmology, similarly to how the Iranic kings encompassed within themselves and represented these three classes.

===== The Sword of Mars =====
According to Jordanes, the Hunnish king Attila from the Migration Period claimed to have obtained the sacred Scythian sword which had fallen from the sky that he called the "Sword of Mars," and which he believed made him powerful in war and made of him the "prince of the entire world." This was a later continuation of the Scythian tradition of the golden objects which had fallen from the heavens.

===== Ossetian parallels =====
In Ossetian folklore, the ancestor of the Ossetian people, Os-Bæǧatyr (Ос-Бæгъатыр), had three sons, respectively named Sidæmon (Сидæмон), Kusæg (Кусæг), and Æǧwyz (Æгъуыз), who each founded a clan. Each of the clans possessed certain attributes, and each of their ancestors among the three sons of Os-Bæǧatyr received an object made of gold corresponding to these attributes:

- Sidæmon received a golden cloth, and his descendants were numerous in number;
- Æǧwyz received a sword, and his descendants were valorous warriors;
- Kusæg received a ball, and his descendants were renowned.

The myth of the sons of Os-Bæǧatyr therefore corresponded to the first variant of the Scythian genealogical myth, with the three sons who founded the three social classes and functions each receiving sacred objects made of gold which represented these functions. Unlike in the Scythian myth, however, each brother became the possessor of one of the three objects, reflecting the more egalitarian social norms of the Sarmatian ancestors of the Ossetians.

====== In the Narty kadǵytæ ======
The Scythian religion's three-fold division of the universe into three levels and society into three classes is present in the Ossetian Narty kadǵytæ, where the three clans of the Nartæ lived in three different neighbourhoods or villages of the same mountain:

- the Æxsærtæggatæ (Ӕхсӕртӕггатӕ) clan represented the warrior class and lived on the higher level of the mountain;
  - The ancestor of the Æxsærtæggatæ, Wærxæg, was a figure who exhibits similarities to Kolaxais.
- the Alægatæ (Алӕгатӕ) clan represented the priestly class and lived on the middle level of the mountain;
- the Borætæ (Борӕтӕ) clan represented the farmer class and lived on the lower level of the mountain.

The different clans corresponded the different social classes, and the levels were they respectively lived represented their respective classes' position within the three-fold class structure of the Scytho-Sarmatian peoples. The location of the Æxsærtæggatæ at the highest level of the mountain was thus a representation of the dominance of the warrior aristocracy over the priestly and farmer classes.

A similar narrative to the myth of the struggle between the Paloi and the Napoi is present in the Narty kadǵytæ, where the clan of the Æxsærtæggatæ, who possess manhood and strength and therefore correspond to the Paralāta-Paloi, exterminate the clan Borætæ, who were wealthy and therefore corresponded to the Katiaroi and Traspies. Only the warrior and producer classes are mentioned in this myth because the priestly class was completely subordinate to the warrior aristocracy.

In the Narty kadǵytæ, the hero Batyraʒ was born from the union of the hero Xæmyts and an unnamed nymph who was the daughter of the river-god Donbettyr, similarly to how the ancestor of the Scythians was born from the union of Targī̆tavah and the Snake-Legged Goddess in the Scythian genealogical myth.

Batyraʒ later had to go through three trials which represented the three social functions to prove himself as the best among the Nartæ: he had to prove himself as a heroic warrior in the first trial; conduct himself decently at feasts held during festivals in the second trial; and conducting himself nobly towards women.

As reward for succeeding in his trial, Batyraʒ received three ancestral treasures, which corresponded to the narrative of Kolaxais successfully passing the test to obtain the three golden objects in the first version of the Scythian genealogical myth, but also to the second version of the genealogical myth where Skythēs had to go through two different trials which each corresponded to one social function.

Batyraʒ thus corresponded to the Iranic concept of the ideal king whose rule is guaranteed by his possession of the physical representations of the three social classes and who embodies their three domains of activity; however, since kingship had ceased to exist among Ossetians, Batyraʒ therefore became the best among the Nartæ instead of the king.

The equivalent of the horse of Kolaxais in the Narty kadǵytæ might have been the celestial horse Ærfæn, who is often referred to as being winged and fiery-footed in the sagas. Ærfæn was the horse of Wastyrǵi, who was the patron saint of men and warriors, or of Wyryzmæg, the eldest member of the Æxsærtæggatæ who was also similar in certain ways to Kolaxais.

Within the Narty kadǵytæ, the closest parallel to Kolaxais was Soslan, and the three celestial boons of the Nartæ were called the treasures of Soslan. Among other presents from the gods, Soslan had received the horse Ærfæn, who was invulnerable just like Soslan and could be killed only by stabbing its hooves. Ærfæn later avenged Soslan by killing the responsible for his death, Syrdon.

Ærfæn itself was the ancestor of a group of miraculous horses named the Dur-dur, meaning "horses of stone," and who bore the epithet of æfsurǧ (Iron Ossetic: ӕфсургъ, from Old Iranic *Aspaugra, meaning "strong horse," and also present in the Sarmatian anthroponym Aspourgios (Ασπουργος) and ethnonym Aspourgioi (Ασπουργιοι)). According to the Narty kadǵytæ, each of the clans of the Nartæ was connected to a clan of horses, and æfsurǧ themselves might have belonged to the Æxsærtæggatæ, who corresponded to Kolaxais and the Paralāta.

The horse of Wyryzmæg and Soslan had a white coat, which connected it to the priestly function, while the horse of Wastyrǵi had a white or red coat, with the red colour being that of the warrior function: this colour combination thus represented the fusion of the priestly and warrior functions and the prominence of the warrior-aristocracy among the Scythian peoples.

==== Indic parallels ====
The meaning of the name of Lipoxšayah as possibly meaning "king of heaven" connected him to sun-deities or to gods of the heavens such as Dyauṣpitṛ and Iūpiter.

The name of Arpoxais was formed following the same structure as the Sanskrit theonym Ṛbhukṣan (ऋभुक्षन्), who was the leader of Ṛbhú and formed a triad with the other two members of the Ṛbhú. Likewise, Arpoxais formed a triad with the Katiaroi and the Traspies, with the name of the Traspies, which was semantically connected to the name of one the Ṛbhu, Vibhu, whose name meant "mighty" and "prosperous."

The name of the father of the Ṛbhu, Sudhanvan, meant "having a good bow," which made him an equivalent of Targī̆tavah, the possession of whose bow was necessary for his sons to obtain royal power.

===== Kingship =====
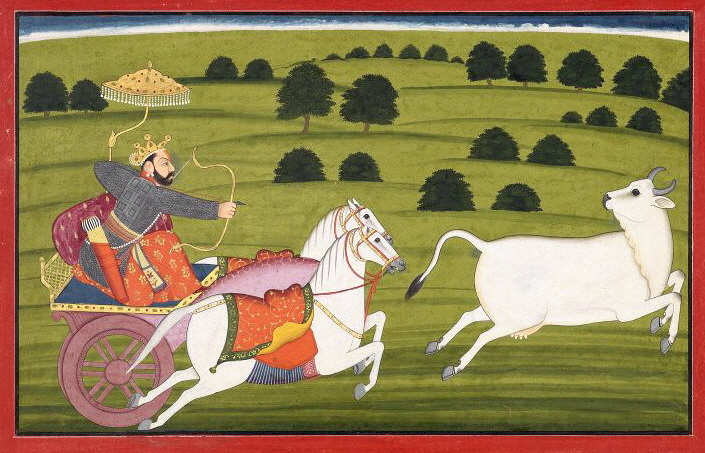
Pṛthu chasing the Earth, who has taken the form of a cow. 18th century illustration.

The narrative of the Kolaxais successfully passing the tests to become king in both versions of the genealogical myth also found a parallel in the Indic myth of the king Pṛthu as retold by Megasthenes, who identified him with the Greek god Dionysos and the Greek hero Hēraklēs. According to Megasthenes's narrative, when "Dionysos" first arrived in India, he found that there was no agriculture, with the people living in a state of savagery, the land remaining uncultivated and not bearing any fruits. "Dionysos" (that is, Pṛthu) then taught Indians to use weapons; and, after finding the land to be uncultivated and barren, he introduced the use of the plough and gave people the seeds of plants, and also taught them how to harvest and store food and grow grapes.

In the original Indic myth, Pṛthu was first consecrated king and the son of the tyrant Veṇā, under whom the land was wild and uncultivated, similarly to how Scythia was initially an uncultivated desert land when Targī̆tavah first arrived there. Before the first king, Pṛthu, was initiated into kingship, all the plants would wither and the people died from hunger. Pṛthu then milked various forms of agricultural knowledge from the Earth, who had taken the form of a cow, and then he first started the practice of tilling the land using a plough and sought to preserve all the food. Thus, thanks to Pṛthu, the Earth began to bear fruit, cows began to produce milk, there was food, and he was responsible for the beginning of settled life and the foundation of cities, trade, cattle-breeding, the tilling of the land, and for the establishment of truth and lies, that is of laws and justice.

The closest Indic parallel to the acquisition of power by Kolaxais through his mastery of the various objects was the rājasūya ceremony through which the king was consecrated. The rājasūya itself was initially a yearly ceremony through which the depleted forces of fertility in the world were restored before they would become depleted again by the end of each following year.

During the rājasūya, the king performed the prayujāṃ haviṃṣi, that is the "harnessing of offerings into the yoke," through which he "harnessed" the year, itself divided into 12 months each represented by an offering, into the yoke used to till the land so as to usher in the rainy season. During the ceremony, the king was identified with the king of the gods, Indra, whose main role was to provide rain, and Indra was considered to be the one who was directing the plough in the field during the ceremony. Thus, the Indic king was identified with Indra during this sacrifice which ended the year and acquired the thirteenth month, that is the New Year. The use of the plough and yoke harnessed to bulls to till the land during the rājasūya, that is for the first time each year and to survey the land, was itself part of the functions of Indo-Iranic kings.

During the rājasūya ceremony, the Indic king was also identified with the god who protected the law, Varuṇa. This thus represented the king's position as the chief judge of his realm, which made him the embodiment of law and righteousness, and therefore his role as the embodiment of the priestly functions.

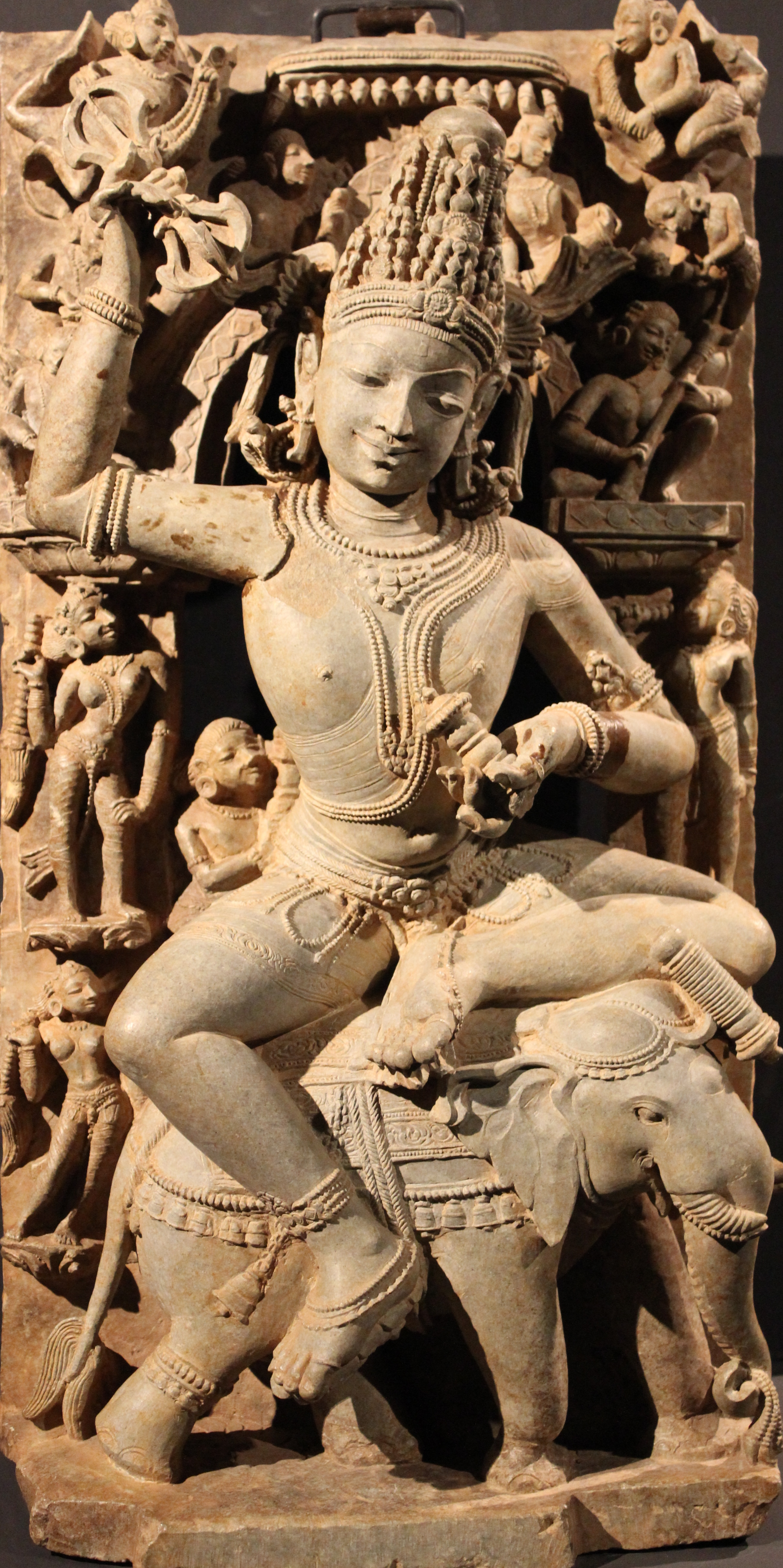
Indra wielding the vajra.

The king was also offered a bow with three arrows during the rājasūya, which represented his masculine royal power and his connection with his heirs.

The cup attached to the belt in the second version of the genealogical myth was also connected to the Indic coronation ritual whereby soma and holy waters used to anoint the king were prepared in similar vessels which were given to the king.

The plough-and-yoke was necessary for the consecration of kings and was a symbol of royal power, with the first tilling by the king and the symbolic delimitation of boundaries being associated to the use of bulls. The bowl and the arrows were also required for the coronation rite.

The plough-and-yoke, vessel and bow therefore signalled the king as representing the functions of all social classes within himself during the rājasūya ceremony. These objects held the same function in the Scythian genealogical myth

The axe of Kolaxais meanwhile semantically corresponded to the percussive instruments wielded by Indra, who was also the god of thunder and rain, such as his ghanaḥ (mace) and vajra (thunderbolt).

The royal wielder of the mace was also connected to the Ṛbhu gods of the airspace, with Indra's vajra being named Ṛbhukṣa after Ṛbhukṣan, who was the leader of the Ṛbhu. The Ṛbhu were also blacksmith gods who created the two horses of Indra; the Ṛbhu also accompanied Indra, and rode on the same chariot as him; Ṛbhukṣan also served Indra and both Indra and Ṛbhukṣan offered sacrifices together, even going so far as to merge.

This association to the Ṛbhu connected Indra to blacksmithing, with the blacksmith in ancient mythologies being a sacred figure who was a thunderer and a divine creator who was linked to ploughing and the liberation of the waters.

=== Non-Iranic parallels ===
==== In Greek mythology ====
The king Cecrops, who, in Greek mythology, was the first king of Athens who had introduced the Athenians to religious rituals and marriage, was an anguipede ancestral figure. Similarly to the Scythian Snake-Legged Goddess, Cecrops was an autochton born from the Earth, and he was human above the waist and a snake below it, which indicated his dual character as being associated with the nether world and death as well as with life and renewal.

==== In Italic mythology ====
The myth of the king Italus recorded by Aristotle was similar to that of Kolaxais in that it was a myth about the deeds of the first king, Italus, who taught the people to cultivate the land.

In Roman mythology, the story of the encounter of Hercules, who was the Italic equivalent of Hēraklēs, with the thief Cacus exhibits some parallels with the story of Hēraklēs's stay in Scythia: Cacus stole four bulls and four cows from the cattle of Geryon that Hercules was driving; this was a model for the historical sacrifice of cows and bulls at the site where Hercules was believed to have defeated Cacus. Although Cacus, like the Scythian Snake-Legged Goddess, had power over the land where he dwelt, the encounter between Hercules and Cacus in the Roman myth was wholly hostile, unlike the amorous one in the Scythian myth.

==== In Celtic mythology ====
===== The myth of Keltine =====
A genealogical legend similar to the Scythian genealogical myth existed in ancient Celtic mythology. This myth was later Hellenised by the ancient Greeks living on the southern coasts of Gaul and recorded by various classical authors.

The combination of the various versions of this myth provides a common narrative:

In Keltikē, that is the Celtic country, the king Bretan(n)os had a daughter named Keltinē or Keltō, who fell in love with "Hēraklēs" who was driving the cattle of Gēryōn from Iberia to Tiryns. Keltinē/Keltō stole the cattle of "Hēraklēs" to force him to have sexual intercourse with her, and from their union was born a son named Galatēs or Keltos to whom the mother gave a bow left by "Hēraklēs." Galatēs/Keltos became king after pulling the bow of "Hēraklēs," and the Celts were descended from him.

Another Celtic version adds that the princess, called Pyrene, bore Heracles a serpent for a son. Those legends are very similar to the Scythian genealogical myth, with common elements including "Hēraklēs" driving the cattle of Gēryōn from Iberia to Greece, and then meeting with a local woman who abducted his horses, having sexual intercourse with the woman, and the birth from this union of a son who founded a nation and became king by pulling his father's bow.

The acquisition of the golden objects by Kolaxais in the first version of the Scythian genealogical myth, especially, has an exact parallel in the inheritance of the bow of "Hēraklēs" by Galatēs/Keltos in the Celtic genealogical myth, with the latter corresponding to the Celtic inheritance law whereby, when heritage was partitioned between brothers, the youngest would receive the estate, all buildings, 8 acres of land, an axe, a cauldron, and a coulter.

There were nevertheless also some differences between the Scythian and Celtic genealogical myths:

- the consort of "Hēraklēs" was the Snake-Legged Goddess in the Scythian myth, while she was a beautiful princess in the Celtic myth;
- the horses of the chariot of "Hēraklēs" were stolen in the Scythian myth, while the cattle of Gēryōn that "Hēraklēs" was driving were stolen in the Celtic myth;
- three sons were born from the union of "Hēraklēs" and the local woman in the Scythian myth, while only one son was born in the Celtic myth.

Despite their similarities, the exact relationship between the Scythian and Celtic genealogical myths is still unclear.

===== Mélusine =====
The fairy Mélusine from mediaeval Celtic folklore also exhibited parallels to the role of the Snake-Legged Goddess in the Scythian genealogical myth. After her husband broke his oath to her and saw her reptilian body, Melusine was forced to leave him.

==== In Germanic mythology ====
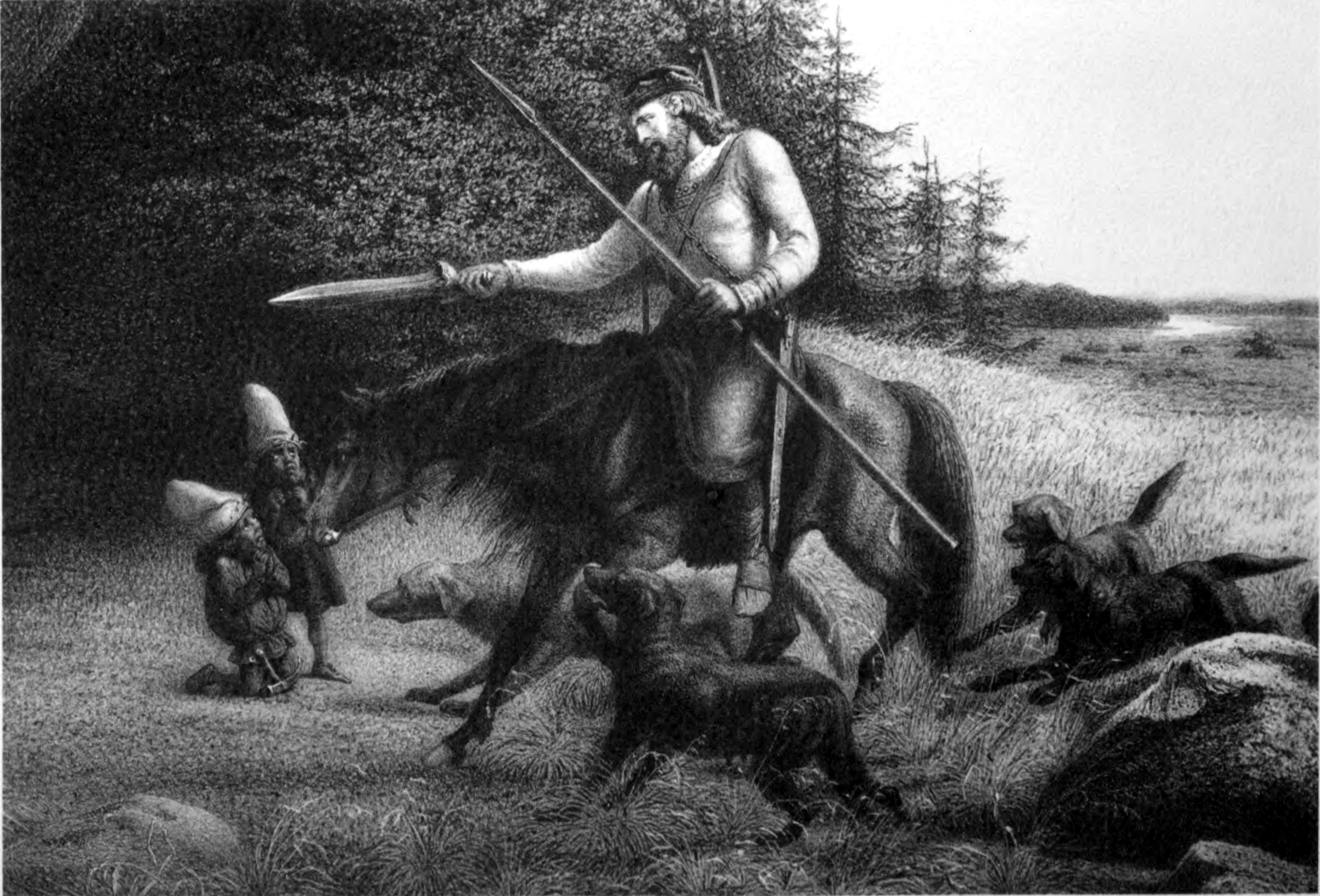
The king Svafrlami receives the sword Tyrfing from the Dwarves. Illustration of the Hervarar saga ok Heiðreks.

The motif of the weapon given to the mortals was present in mediaeval Germanic myth, with the transmission of a sword being connected to a prophecy in both the Hervarar saga ok Heiðreks and the Visio Domini Karoli Regis Francorvm; due to the production techniques and the use of steel, which was a scarce material, swords were seen as symbols of status in mediaeval Germanic societies.

These swords were also seen as magical objects with their own names and personalities, with their power being considered to be of otherworldly origin that was either supernatural or chthonic, and in the myths they were often manufactured by Dwarves. The fate of these swords' owners was linked to them in mysterious and deadly ways, and whoever obtained them also gained the virtues of their previous owners.

==== In Slavic mythology ====
Like the Scythian blacksmith-king Kolaxais, it was Kyi, who was one of three brothers and a blacksmith, who founded the city of Kyiv in Slavic mythology.

=== Turkic borrowings ===
The Scythian genealogical myth was borrowed by certain Turkic peoples who had assimilated the Saka peoples of Central Asia. Such a borrowed version is present in the Uyghur version of the Oghuz Name, according to which the ancestor of the Oghuz Turks, Oghuz Qaghan, had two wives.

The first wife of Oghuz Qaghan came down to the earth from the sky in a ray of blue light, and with her he had three sons, named:

- Kün (meaning "Sun"),
- Ay (meaning "Moon"),
- Yultuz (meaning "Star").

Oghuz Qaghan's second wife was first found inside a tree in the middle of a lake, and with her he had three sons, named:

- Kök (meaning "Sky"),
- Tagh (meaning "Mountain"),
- Dëngiz (meaning "Sea").

Oghuz Qaghan's sons from his first wife became the ancestors of the qaɣans, while his sons from his second wife became the subjects of the qaghans. This myth is based on the opposition of the celestial and earthly binary whereby the woman from heaven became the ancestress of the rulers and the woman from the earth became the ancestress of the subjects.

Although the celestial characters of the sons of the celestial wife of Oghuz Qaghan correspond to the celestial nature of their mother, the sons of Oghuz Qaghan's earthly wife do not all have earthly characters, and instead represent the three layers of the universe, with Kök (Sky) standing for the celestial realm, Tagh (Mountain) for the earthly realm, and Dëngiz for the marine and chthonic realm.

The narrative of the three brothers representing the three layers of the universe who were born from the earthly maiden did not represent the traditional Turkic cosmology, but instead corresponded to the Iranic one due to having been borrowed from the Saka peoples of Central Asia. Since early Turkic societies were different from Iranic ones, the myth's meaning relating to the origin of social functions was therefore not retained when it was borrowed, due to which the difference between the three brothers did not play any important role in the Turkic legend and even contradicted the myth itself.

== Sources ==
- Braund, David (2005). "Reflections on Eumelus' Black Sea region". Collection de l'Institut des Sciences et Techniques de l'Antiquité [Collection of the Institute of Sciences and Techniques of Antiquity]. 979: 99–112.
- Braund, David (2007). "Greater Olbia: Ethnic, Religious, Economic, and Political Interactions in the Region of Olbia, c.600–100 BC". In Braund, David; Kryzhintskiy, S. D. [in Russian] (eds.). Classical Olbia and the Scythian World: From the Sixth Century BC to the Second Century AD. Oxford, United Kingdom: Oxford University Press. pp. 33–77. ISBN 978-0-197-26404-1.
- Braund, David (2021). "Heracles' Footprint by the River Tyras: Immortality and Acculturation on the Geto-Scythian Frontier". In Braund, David; Stolba, Vladimir F.; Peter, Ulrike (eds.). Environment and Habitation around the Ancient Black Sea. Berlin, Germany: De Gruyter. pp. 177–194. doi:10.1515/9783110715972-010. ISBN 978-3-110-71570-5.
- Bukharin, Mikhail Dmitrievich [in Russian] (2013). "Колаксай и его братья (античная традиция о происхождении царской власти у скифов" [Kolaxais and his Brothers (Classical Tradition on the Origin of the Royal Power of the Scythians)]. Аристей: вестник классической филологии и античной истории (in Russian). 8: 20–80.
- Cunliffe, Barry (2019). The Scythians: Nomad Warriors of the Steppe. Oxford, United Kingdom; New York City, United States: Oxford University Press. ISBN 978-0-198-82012-3.
- Egelhaaf-Gaiser, Ulrike [in German] (2020). "Der Fußabdruck des Herakles: Wegspuren, Landmarken und Lesezeichen in der Skythenerzählung des Herodot (4,82)" [The Footprint of Heracles: Trails, Landmarks, and Bookmarks in Herodotus' Scythian Narrative (4:82)]. Antiquity and Occident (in German). 65–66 (1): 21–55. doi:10.1515/anab-2019-0002.
- Geary, Patrick J. (1994). "Germanic Tradition and Royal Ideology in the Ninth Century: The Visio Karoli Magni". Living with the Dead in the Middle Ages. Ithaca, United States: Cornell University Press. p. 63. doi:10.7591/9781501721632-005. ISBN 978-0-8014-8098-0. S2CID 243753185.
- Harmatta, János (1996). "10.4.1. The Scythians". In Hermann, Joachim; Zürcher, Erik; Harmatta, János; Litvak, J. K.; Lonis, R. [in French]; Obenga, T.; Thapar, R.; Zhou, Yiliang (eds.). From the Seventh Century B.C. to the Seventh Century A.D. History of Humanity. Vol. 3. London, United Kingdom; New York City, United States; Paris, France: Routledge; UNESCO. ISBN 978-9-231-02812-0.
- Ivantchik, Askold I. (1999). "Une légende sur l'origine des Scythes (HDT. IV 5-7) et le problème des sources du Scythicos logos d'Hérodote" [A Legend on the Origin of the Scythians (Hdt. IV 5-7) and the problems of the sources of Herodotus's Scythicos logos]. Revue des Études Grecques [Review of Greek Studies] (in French). 112 (1): 141–192. doi:10.3406/reg.1999.4355. JSTOR 44260011.
- Ivantchik, Askold I. (2002). "Un fragment de l'épopée scythe: "le cheval de Colaxaïs" dans un partheneion d'Alcman" [A Fragment of the Scythian Epic: the "horse of Kolaxais" in a parthenion of Alcman]. Ktèma: civilisations de l'Orient, de la Grèce et de Rome antiques [Ktèma: Civilisations of the Ancient Orient, Greece, and Rome] (in French). 27: 257–264. doi:10.3406/ktema.2002.2341.
- Ivantchik, Askold I. (2016). "IV. L'idéologie royale des Scythes et son expression dans la littérature et l'iconographie grecques : l'apport de la numismatique" [IV. The Royal Ideology of the Scythians and its Expression in Greek Literature and Iconography: the Contribution of Numismatics]. Dialogues d'histoire ancienne [Dialogues of Ancient History]. 42 (1): 305–329.
- Ivantchik, Askold (2018). "Scythians". Encyclopædia Iranica. New York City, United States: Encyclopædia Iranica Foundation; Brill Publishers.
- Lincoln, Bruce (2012). "The One and the Many in Iranian Creation Myths: Rethinking "Nostalgia for Paradise"". Archiv für Religionsgeschichte. 13 (1): 15–30. doi:10.1515/afgs.2012.15.
- Lincoln, Bruce (2014). "Once again 'the Scythian' myth of origins (Herodotus 4.5–10)". Nordlit. 33 (33). Tromsø, Norway: Septentrio Academic Publishing on behalf of The University of Tromsø – The Arctic University of Norway: 19–34. doi:10.7557/13.3188.
- Lincoln, Bruce (2018). "Greeks and Scythians in Conversation". Apples and Oranges: Explorations In, On, and With Comparison. Chicago, United States: University of Chicago Press. pp. 84–95. doi:10.7208/9780226564104-009 (inactive July 12, 2025).
- Olbrycht, Marek Jan (2000). "Remarks on the Presence of Iranian Peoples in Europe and Their Asiatic Relations". Collectanea Celto-Asiatica Cracoviensia. Kraków: Księgarnia Akademicka. pp. 101–140. ISBN 978-8-371-88337-8.
- Parzinger, Hermann (2004). Die Skythen [The Scythians] (in German). Munich, Germany: Verlag C.H.Beck. ISBN 978-3-406-50842-4.
- Podossinov, Alexander V. [in Russian] (2022). "Heracles Celticus and Heracles Scythicus: the Same Narrative in the West and East of Europe?". In Boardman, J.; Hargrave, J.; Avram, A.; Podossinov, A. [in Russian] (eds.). Connecting the Ancient West and East: Studies Presented to Prof. Gocha R. Tsetskhladze. Leuven, Belgium: Peeters Publishers. pp. 1291–1306. ISBN 978-9-042-94414-5.
- Petrain, David (2016). "Hearing Heracles on the Tabula Albani". In Sistakou, Evina; Rengakos, Antonios (eds.). Dialect, Diction, and Style in Greek Literary and Inscribed Epigram. Trends in Classics - Supplementary Volumes. Berlin, Germany: De Gruyter. pp. 335–360. ISBN 978-3-110-49649-9.
- Raevskiy, Dmitriy [in Russian] (1993). Marazov, Ivan (ed.). Scythian Mythology. Sofia, Bulgaria: Secor Publishers. ISBN 978-9-548-25002-3.
- Redondo, Jordi (2022). "The Herodotean Myth on the Origin of the Scythians". In Christopoulos, Menelaos; Papachrysostomou, Athina; Antonopoulos, Andreas P. (eds.). Myth and History: Close Encounters. Berlin, Germany; Boston, United States: Walter de Gruyter GmbH. pp. 167–186. doi:10.1515/9783110780116-011. ISBN 978-3-110-77958-5.
- Rusyayeva, A. S. [in Ukrainian] (2007). "Religious Interactions between Olbia and Scythia". In Braund, David; Kryzhintskiy, S. D. [in Russian] (eds.). Classical Olbia and the Scythian World: From the Sixth Century BC to the Second Century AD. Oxford, United Kingdom: Oxford University Press. pp. 93–102. ISBN 978-0-197-26404-1.
- Safaee, Yazdan (2020). "Scythian and Zoroastrian Earth Goddesses: A Comparative Study on Api and Ārmaiti". In Niknami, Kamal-Aldin; Hozhabri, Ali (eds.). Archaeology of Iran in the Historical Period. University of Tehran Science and Humanities Series. Cham, Germany: Springer International Publishing. pp. 65–75. doi:10.1007/978-3-030-41776-5_6. ISBN 978-3-030-41776-5. S2CID 219515548.
- Shahbazi, A. Shapur (2004). "Iraj". Encyclopædia Iranica. New York City, United States: Encyclopædia Iranica Foundation; Brill Publishers.
- Sulimirski, T. (1985). "The Scyths". In Gershevitch, I. (ed.). The Median and Achaemenian Periods. The Cambridge History of Iran. Vol. 2. Cambridge, United Kingdom: Cambridge University Press. pp. 149–199. ISBN 978-1-139-05493-5.
- Tafażżolī, Aḥmad (1999). "Ferēdūn". Encyclopædia Iranica. New York City, United States: Encyclopædia Iranica Foundation; Brill Publishers.
- Ustinova, Yulia (1999). The Supreme Gods of the Bosporan Kingdom: Celestial Aphrodite and the Most High God. Leiden, Netherlands; Boston, United States: Brill Publishers. ISBN 978-9-004-11231-5.
- Ustinova, Yulia (2005). "Snake-Limbed and Tendril-Limbed Goddesses in the Art and Mythology of the Mediterranean and the Black Sea". Scythians and Greeks: Cultural Interaction in Scythia, Athens and the Early Roman Empire (sixth Century BC - First Century AD). Exeter, United Kingdom: University of Exeter Press. pp. 64–79. ISBN 978-0-859-89746-4.
- Visintin, Monica (2000). "Echidna, Skythes e l'arco Di Herakles. Figure Della Marginalità Nella Versione Greca Delle Origini Degli Sciti, Herodot. 4, 8-10" [Echidna, Skythes and the Bow of Herakles. Figures of Marginality in the Greek Version of the Origins of the Scythians, Herodot. 4, 8-10]. Materiali e discussioni per l'analisi dei testi classici [Materials and Discussions for the Analysis of Classical Texts] (in Italian). 45 (45): 43–81. doi:10.2307/40236179. JSTOR 40236179.
- Zaikov, A. V. (2004). "Alcman and the Image of Scythian Steed". In Tuplin, Christopher (ed.). Pontus and the Outside World: Studies in Black Sea History, Historiography, and Archaeology. Colloquia Pontica. Leiden, Netherlands: Brill Publishers. pp. 69–84. ISBN 978-9-004-12154-6.
