= Visio Karoli Magni =

9th-century Latin poem

Start of the Visio in the Frankfurt manuscript

The Latin poem conventionally titled Visio Karoli Magni ("Vision of Charles the Great"), and in the manuscripts Visio Domini Karoli Regis Francorvm ("Vision of the Lord Charles, King of the Franks"), was written by an anonymous East Frank around 865. Sometimes classified as visionary literature, the Visio is not a typical example the genre, since the "vision" it presents is merely a dream.

== Textual transmission ==
The Visio is preserved in only two manuscripts, both of the twelfth century. One is kept in the Stadt- und Universitätsbibliothek in Frankfurt am Main in MS Barth. 67, folios 131r–132r. The other is in the Bibliothèque Nationale de France in Paris, where it is MS lat. 5016, folios 159v–169v.

The first modern edition of the poem, in 1837, was by the German scholar Eberhard Gottlieb Graff, based on the Frankfurt manuscript alone. Jean-François Gadan published an edition in his Collection du bibliophile troyen: recueil de pièces concernant la ville de Troyes ou conservées dans sa bibliothèque (Troyes, 1851), but this was based solely on the Paris manuscript. Philippe Jaffé provided the first modern edition based on both manuscripts, in the Bibliotheca rerum Germanicarum, volume IV (Berlin, 1867), pages 701–704. Only a few years later a German, Heinrich Gottfried Gengler, provided a second edition from both manuscripts in the Germanische Rechtsdenkmäler (Erlangen, 1875). The most recent edition was made in 1981 by Patrick Geary from the Frankfurt manuscript with alternative readings from the Parisian. He presented it at the end of his paper "Germanic Tradition and Royal Ideology in the Ninth Century: The Visio Karoli Magni".

== Story ==
The Visio relates an apocryphal story about Charlemagne, who was said to keep a lamp and writing utensils bedside, so that he might write down anything recollected from his dreams that was worth remembering. One night, in a dream, the emperor was approached by one bearing a sword. When asked about his identity the swordbearer only warned the emperor to heed the words engraved (litteris exarata) on the blade of the sword, for they were a prophecy that would come true. There were four words, seemingly of Germanic origin, engraved on the blade, from the hilt to the tip they were: RAHT, RADOLEIBA, NASG, and ENTI. Charlemagne immediately recorded all of it on his tablets.

The next morning Charlemagne was discussing the dream with his befuddled advisors when one of them, "wiser than the others", Einhard, in fact Charlemagne's biographer, said that the one who had given the sword would explain its meaning. Charlemagne himself then begins to interpret it: the sword is the (military) power he has from God, RAHT meant abundance beyond what his parents enjoyed, RADOLEIBA meant that his sons will share less abundance than he, NASG meant that they will be greedy and oppressive towards the Church, and ENTI meant simply "the end".

The anonymous author asserts that he received the story from Rabanus Maurus, who told it widely after rising to the Archbishopric of Mainz. Rabanus was said to have heard it from Einhard, who had it from the mouth of Charlemagne. The author then explains how the prophecy of the sword has come true: during the reign of Charlemagne's son Louis the Pious the Bretons and Slavs revolted, after Louis's death the kingdom was torn by civil war as his sons Lothair, Pepin (actually a grandson), and Louis the German fought for support among the nobility, Pepin and Lothair usurped the property of monasteries in Aquitaine and Italy respectively, and the bishops of the Church had sent a letter with Witgar begging Louis to make peace throughout the realm. This letter, the author claims, is preserved in the church of Saint Martin in Mainz.

== Analysis ==
The origins of the story were a mystery for a long time, but it now seems clear that it can be associated with the reign of Louis the German and with the city and church of Mainz. The Frankfurt manuscript was probably copied at Mainz, and the anonymous author of the text may have been a cleric at the local church. The Paris manuscript may be from the church of Saint Afra in Augsburg. Witgar was the bishop of Augsburg from 858 to 875 and Charles, brother of the aforementioned Pepin, was the archbishop of Mainz from 856 until 866. Since the Visio attacks the policies of Lothair and Pepin and extols the virtue of Louis the German, it was probably written during the episcopate of Pepin's brother and sometime after the letter of Witgar, probably around 865.

The vision itself is probably to be connected to Charlemagne's palace at Nieder-Ingelheim in the Maingau, which in the fourteenth century was his purported birthplace and which the Emperor Charles IV (1354) referred to as the place where his predecessor received from an angel a sword. All this might suggest the survival of the legend of the vision in the region around Mainz even as its popularity as literature was low everywhere else.

Dieter Geuenich has argued that the presentation of a story revolving around the interpretation of Germanic words would have been well received at the court of Louis the German, who sought to "cultivate" the theodisca lingua (German language). The Visio can be seen as a piece of the propaganda of a consciously developed East Frankish (aristocratic) culture that patronised the Germanic language. Louis the German is presented as the superior of his relatives from elsewhere in Christendom; East Francia is the last refuge of the Church.

== Sources ==
- Geary, Patrick J. (1987). "Germanic Tradition and Royal Ideology in the Ninth Century: The Visio Karoli Magni." Frühmittelalterliche Studien, 21: 274–294. Reprinted in Living with the Dead in the Middle Ages. Ithaca: Cornell University Press, 1994. ISBN 0-8014-8098-1.
- Lewis, Andrew W. (1981). Royal Succession in Capetian France: Studies on Familial Order and the State. Cambridge, Massachusetts: Harvard University Press. ISBN 0-674-77985-1.
- MacLean, Simon (2003). Kingship and Politics in the Late Ninth Century: Charles the Fat and the end of the Carolingian Empire. Cambridge: Cambridge University Press.
- Müller, Stephan (2000). "Die Präsenz der Schrift zwischen Vision und Wissen: Zur Deutbarkeit der vier scheinbar deutschen Wörter in der ‚Visio Karoli Magni‘". Zeitschrift für deutsche Philologie, 119: 98–102.
