= Budini =

Ancient tribe described by Herodotus

The Budini (Ancient Greek: Βουδῖνοι) were an ancient Scythian tribe whose existence was recorded by ancient Graeco-Roman authors.

The Budini were closely related to the Androphagi and the Melanchlaeni.

== Location ==
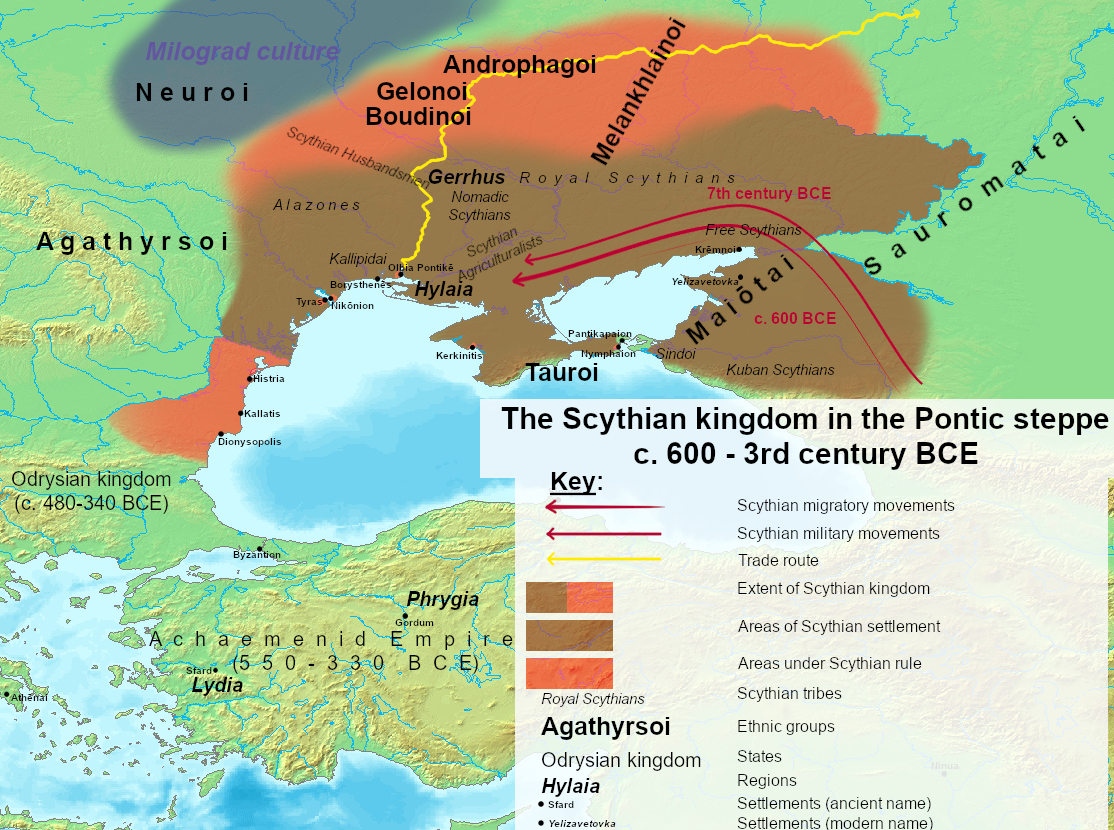
The location of the Budini near Scythia.

The Budini lived alongside the Gelonians in the valley of the Vorskla river.

== History ==
=== Origin ===
The Scythians originated in the region of the Volga-Ural steppes of Central Asia, possibly around the 9th century BC, as a section of the population of the Srubnaya culture containing a significant element originating from the Siberian Andronovo culture. The population of the Srubnaya culture was among the first truly nomadic pastoralist groups, who themselves emerged in the Central Asian and Siberian steppes during the 9th century BC as a result of the cold and dry climate then prevailing in these regions.

During the 9th to 8th centuries BC, a significant movement of the nomadic peoples of the Eurasian Steppe started when another nomadic Iranic tribe closely related to the Scythians from eastern Central Asia, either the Massagetae or the Issedones, migrated westwards, forcing the early Scythians to the west across the Araxes (Volga) river.

Over the course of the 8th and 7th centuries BC, the Scythians migrated into the Caucasian and Caspian Steppes in several waves, becoming the dominant population of the region, where they assimilated most of the Cimmerians and conquered their territory, with this absorption of the Cimmerians by the Scythians being facilitated by their similar ethnic backgrounds and lifestyles, after which the Scythians settled in the area between the Araxes, the Caucasus and the Lake Maeotis. The section of the Scythians from whom the Budini originated participated in this migration, and had established itself in Ciscaucasia around c. 800 BC.

From their base in the Caucasian Steppe, during the period of the 8th to 7th centuries BC itself, the Scythians conquered the Pontic and Crimean Steppes to the north of the Black Sea up to the Danube river, which formed the western boundary of Scythian territory onwards, with this process of Scythian takeover of the Pontic Steppe becoming fully complete by the 7th century BC.

Archaeologically, the westwards migration of the Early Scythians from Central Asia into the Caspian Steppe constituted the latest of the two to three waves of expansion of the Srubnaya culture to the west of the Volga. The last and third wave corresponding to the Scythian migration has been dated to the 9th century BC. The expansion of the Scythians into the Pontic Steppe is attested through the westward movement of the Srubnaya-Khvalynsk culture into Ukraine. The Srubnaya-Khvalynsk culture in Ukraine is referred to in scholarship as the "Late Srubnaya" culture.

=== Migration towards the forest steppe ===
From the Caucasian steppe, the tribe of the Royal Scythians expanded to the south, following the coast of the Caspian Sea and arrived in the Ciscaucasian steppes, from where they settled in eastern Transcaucasia until the early 6th century BC.

The Royal Scythians were finally expelled from West Asia in the c. 600s BC, after which, beginning in the later 7th and lasting throughout much of the 6th century BC, the majority of the Scythians migrated from Ciscaucasia into the Pontic Steppe, which became the centre of Scythian power.

The retreat of the Royal Scythians from West Asia into the Pontic steppe pushed a Scythian splinter group to the north, into what is the present-day region of Donets-Kramatorsk, where they formed the Vorskla and Sula-Donets groups of the Scythian culture, of which the Donets group corresponded to the Melanchlaeni, the Sula group to the Androphagi, and the Vorskla group to the Budini., with all of these groups remaining independent from the Scythians proper.

=== Gelonus ===
During the 6th century BC, the city of Gelonus was built in the country of the Budini, where the Gelonians set up an important industrial, commercial, and political centre. This city was protected by a defensive system of three earthworks surrounded by ramparts. The present-day site of Bilsk hill fort (Coordinates 50°5′34″N 34°38′46″E ) is one hypothesized location for Gelonus.

The Budini and Gelonians both lived in Gelonus, although each population lived in separate sections of the city: the Gelonians lived in the eastern earthwork, where was located the city's industrial, commercial, and political centre; the poorer native Budini lived in the western earthwork.

=== The Persian invasion ===
When the Persian Achaemenid king Darius I attacked the Scythians in 513 BC, the Scythian king Idanthyrsus summoned the kings of the peoples surrounding his kingdom to a meeting to decide how to deal with the Persian invasion. The kings of the Budini, Gelonians and Sarmatians agreed to help the Scythians against the Persian attack, while the kings of the Agathyrsi, Androphagi, Melanchlaeni, Neuri, and Tauri refused to support the Scythians.

During the campaign, Darius captured the city of Gelonus and set it on fire.

== Society and culture ==
The Budini were culturally similar to the other Scythian tribes of the forest steppe, such as the Androphagi and the Melanchlaeni.

=== Appearance ===
According to Herodotus of Halicarnassus, the Budini had red hair (purron) and blue eyes (glaukon).

=== Lifestyle ===
The Budini were poorer than the Gelonians and led a largely nomadic life and were dependent on hunting otters, beavers, and other animals. The territories where the Budini lived were thickly forested.

=== Language ===
The Budini were described by Herodotus of Halicarnassus as speaking a different language from the Gelonians, the latter of whom might have originated as a group of the Scythians proper.

=== Clothing ===
The Budini lined their cloaks with the skin of the otters, beavers, and other animals that they hunted.

== Ritual cannibalism ==
The remains of intact human bones discovered in seven earthworks of the Budini and Melanchlaeni suggests that these two tribes might have engaged in ritual cannibalism similarly to the Androphagi.

== Crafts ==
The Budini and Gelonians brought ores from outside to the industrial section of the city of Gelonus, where iron and copper were smelted from them.

== Trade ==
The Budini and the Gelonians participated in the ancient trade route which started from the ancient Greek colony of Pontic Olbia on the northern shore of the Black Sea and continued to the north-east into the steppe and forest-steppe regions.

== Archaeology ==
The Budini archaeologically belonged to the Scythian culture, and they corresponded to its Vorskla group, which extended over the basin of the Vorskla river in the Eastern European forest steppe zone.

The Donets, Sula and Vorskla groups of the Scythian culture, respectively corresponding to the Melanchlaeni, Androphagi, and Budini, are sometimes grouped the Zolnichnaya (that is "Ash-Mounds") culture because of the presence of several zolnyk (зольник), that is ash mounds containing refuse from kitchens and other sources, near dwellings. The three groups of the Zolnichnaya culture were closely related to each other, with the Vorskla group nevertheless exhibiting enough significant differences from the Sula and Donets groups that the latter two are sometimes grouped together as a Sula-Donets group distinct from the Vorskla group.

== Sources ==
- Barnett, R. D. (1991). "Urartu". In Boardman, John; Edwards, I. E. S.; Hammond, N. G. L.; Sollberger, E. (eds.). The Prehistory of the Balkans; and the Middle East and the Aegean world, tenth to eighth centuries B.C. The Cambridge Ancient History. Vol. 3. Cambridge, United Kingdom: Cambridge University Press. pp. 314–371. ISBN 978-1-139-05428-7.
- Batty, Roger (2007). Rome and the Nomads: The Pontic-Danubian Realm in Antiquity. Oxford: Oxford University Press. ISBN 978-0-198-14936-1.
- Bouzek, Jan [in Hungarian] (2001). "Cimmerians and Early Scythians: the Transition from Geometric to Orientalising Style in the Pontic Area". In Tsetskhladze, G.R. (ed.). North Pontic Archaeology: Recent Discoveries and Studies. Leiden, Netherlands: Brill Publishers. pp. 33–44. ISBN 978-9-004-12041-9.
- Diakonoff, I. M. (1985). "Media". In Gershevitch, Ilya (ed.). The Median and Achaemenian Periods. The Cambridge History of Iran. Vol. 2. Cambridge, United Kingdom: Cambridge University Press. ISBN 978-0-521-20091-2.
- Harmatta, János (1996). "10.4.1. The Scythians". In Hermann, Joachim; Zürcher, Erik; Harmatta, János; Litvak, J. K.; Lonis, R. [in French]; Obenga, T.; Thapar, R.; Zhou, Yiliang (eds.). From the Seventh Century B.C. to the Seventh Century A.D. History of Humanity. Vol. 3. London, United Kingdom; New York City, United States; Paris, France: Routledge; UNESCO. ISBN 978-9-231-02812-0.
- Herodotus; Godolphin, Francis R. B. (1973). "Herodotus: On the Scythians". The Metropolitan Museum of Art Bulletin. 32 (5): 129–149. doi:10.2307/3269235. JSTOR 3269235.
- Ivantchik, Askold (1993a). Les Cimmériens au Proche-Orient [The Cimmerians in the Near East] (PDF) (in French). Fribourg, Switzerland; Göttingen, Germany: Éditions Universitaires Fribourg (Switzerland); Vandenhoeck & Ruprecht (Germany). ISBN 978-3-727-80876-0.
- Jacobson, Esther (1995). The Art of the Scythians: The Interpenetration of Cultures at the Edge of the Hellenic World. Leiden, Netherlands: Brill Publishers. ISBN 978-9-004-09856-5.
- Melyukova, A. I. (1990). "The Scythians and Sarmatians". In Sinor, Denis (ed.). The Cambridge History of Early Inner Asia. Cambridge, United Kingdom: Cambridge University Press. pp. 97–117. ISBN 978-0-521-24304-9.
- Olbrycht, Marek Jan (2000a). "The Cimmerian Problem Re-Examined: the Evidence of the Classical Sources". In Pstrusińska, Jadwiga [in Polish]; Fear, Andrew (eds.). Collectanea Celto-Asiatica Cracoviensia. Kraków: Księgarnia Akademicka. pp. 71–100. ISBN 978-8-371-88337-8.
- Olbrycht, Marek Jan (2000b). "Remarks on the Presence of Iranian Peoples in Europe and Their Asiatic Relations". In Pstrusińska, Jadwiga [in Polish]; Fear, Andrew (eds.). Collectanea Celto-Asiatica Cracoviensia. Kraków: Księgarnia Akademicka. pp. 101–140. ISBN 978-8-371-88337-8.
- Phillips, E. D. (1972). "The Scythian Domination in Western Asia: Its Record in History, Scripture and Archaeology". World Archaeology. 4 (2): 129–138. doi:10.1080/00438243.1972.9979527. JSTOR 123971.
- Sulimirski, T. (1954). "Scythian Antiquities in Western Asia". Artibus Asiae. 17 (3). Ascona, Switzerland: Artibus Asiae Publishers: 282–318. doi:10.2307/3249059. JSTOR 3249059.
- Sulimirski, T. (1985). "The Scyths". In Gershevitch, I. (ed.). The Median and Achaemenian Periods. The Cambridge History of Iran. Vol. 2. Cambridge, United Kingdom: Cambridge University Press. pp. 149–199. ISBN 978-1-139-05493-5.
- Sulimirski, Tadeusz; Taylor, T. F. (1991). "The Scythians". In Boardman, John; Edwards, I. E. S.; Hammond, N. G. L.; Sollberger, E.; Walker, C. B. F. (eds.). The Assyrian and Babylonian Empires and other States of the Near East, from the Eighth to the Sixth Centuries B.C. The Cambridge Ancient History. Vol. 3. Cambridge, United Kingdom: Cambridge University Press. pp. 547–590. ISBN 978-1-139-05429-4.
