= Melanchlaeni =

Ancient tribe described by Herodotus

The Melanchlaeni, also known as the Saudaratae, were an ancient Scythian tribe whose existence was recorded by ancient Graeco-Roman authors.

The Melanchlaeni were closely related to the Androphagi and the Budini.

== Name ==
The name Melanchlaeni is a Latinisation of the ancient Greek name Melankhlainoi (Ancient Greek: Μελάγχλαινοι), which meant "Black-Cloaks."

The Greek name might have been a translation of an ancient Iranic name meaning "those who wear black garments," whose later form, Sawdarata, was recorded in Ancient Greek as Saudaratai (Ancient Greek: Σαυδαραται; Latin: Saudaratae).

== Location ==
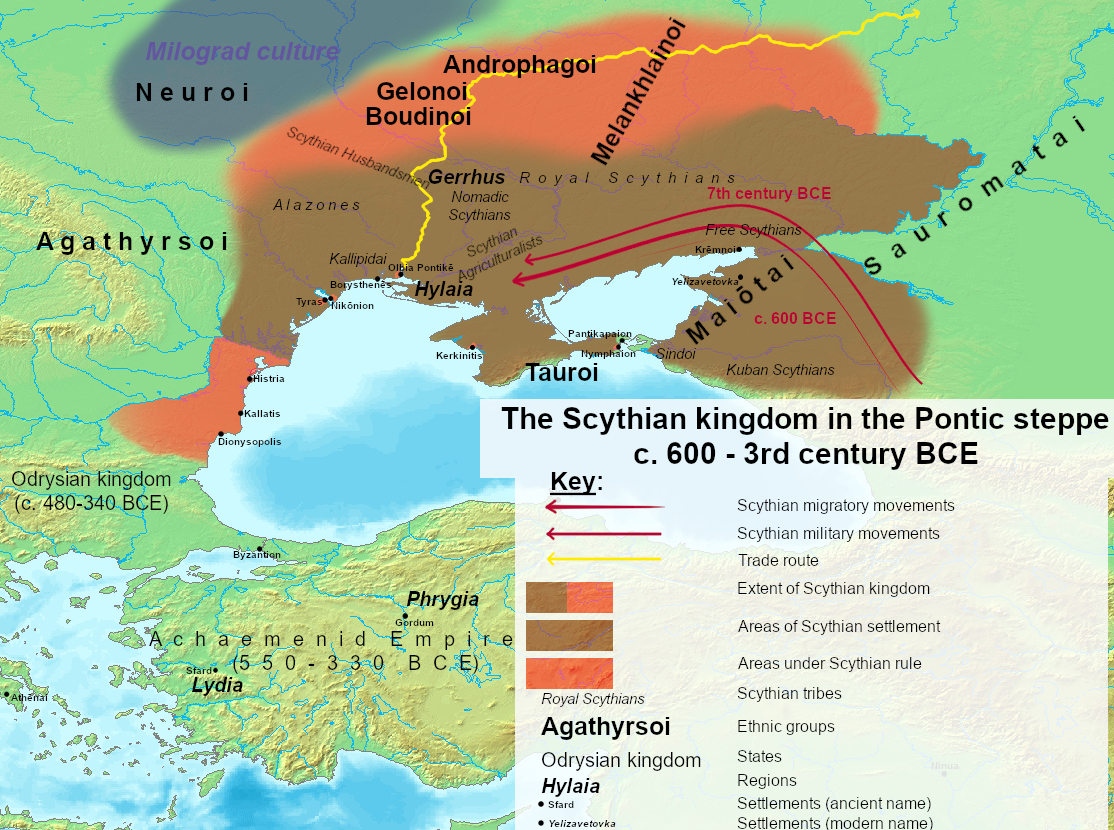
The location of the Melanchlaeni near Scythia.

The Melanchlaeni lived in the region to the east of the middle Dnipro river, especially in the basin of the Donets river.

The neighbours of the Melanchlaeni were the Neuri and the Scythian tribe of the Aroteres to the west, and the Scythian tribe of the Paralatae to the south.

== History ==
=== Origin ===
The Scythians originated in the region of the Volga-Ural steppes of Central Asia, possibly around the 9th century BC, as a section of the population of the Srubnaya culture containing a significant element originating from the Siberian Andronovo culture. The population of the Srubnaya culture was among the first truly nomadic pastoralist groups, who themselves emerged in the Central Asian and Siberian steppes during the 9th century BC as a result of the cold and dry climate then prevailing in these regions.

During the 9th to 8th centuries BC, a significant movement of the nomadic peoples of the Eurasian Steppe started when another nomadic Iranic tribe closely related to the Scythians from eastern Central Asia, either the Massagetae or the Issedones, migrated westwards, forcing the early Scythians to the west across the Araxes river.

Over the course of the 8th and 7th centuries BC, the Scythians migrated into the Caucasian and Caspian Steppes in several waves, becoming the dominant population of the region, where they assimilated most of the Cimmerians and conquered their territory, with this absorption of the Cimmerians by the Scythians being facilitated by their similar ethnic backgrounds and lifestyles, after which the Scythians settled in the area between the Araxes, the Caucasus and the Lake Maeotis. The section of the Scythians from whom the Melanchlaeni originated participated in this migration, and had established itself in Ciscaucasia around c. 800 BC.

From their base in the Caucasian Steppe, during the period of the 8th to 7th centuries BC itself, the Scythians conquered the Pontic and Crimean Steppes to the north of the Black Sea up to the Danube river, which formed the western boundary of Scythian territory onwards, with this process of Scythian takeover of the Pontic Steppe becoming fully complete by the 7th century BC.

Archaeologically, the westwards migration of the Early Scythians from Central Asia into the Caspian Steppe constituted the latest of the two to three waves of expansion of the Srubnaya culture to the west of the Volga. The last and third wave corresponding to the Scythian migration has been dated to the 9th century BC. The expansion of the Scythians into the Pontic Steppe is attested through the westward movement of the Srubnaya-Khvalynsk culture into Ukraine. The Srubnaya-Khvalynsk culture in Ukraine is referred to in scholarship as the "Late Srubnaya" culture.

=== Migration towards the forest steppe ===
From the Caucasian steppe, the tribe of the Royal Scythians expanded to the south, following the coast of the Caspian Sea and arrived in the Ciscaucasian steppes, from where they settled in eastern Transcaucasia until the early 6th century BC.

The Royal Scythians were finally expelled from West Asia in the c. 600s BC, after which, beginning in the later 7th and lasting throughout much of the 6th century BC, the majority of the Scythians migrated from Ciscaucasia into the Pontic Steppe, which became the centre of Scythian power.

The retreat of the Royal Scythians from West Asia into the Pontic steppe pushed a Scythian splinter group to the north, into the region of Donets-Kramatorsk, where they formed the Vorskla and Sula-Donets groups of the Scythian culture, of which the Donets group corresponded to the Melanchlaeni, the Sula group to the Androphagi, and the Vorskla group to the Budini., with all of these groups remaining independent from the Scythians proper.

Of these groups, the Melanchlaeni and the Androphagi were closely related tribes.

=== The Persian invasion ===
When the Persian Achaemenid king Darius I attacked the Scythians in 513 BC, the Scythian king Idanthyrsus summoned the kings of the peoples surrounding his kingdom to a meeting to decide how to deal with the Persian invasion. The kings of the Budini, Gelonians and Sarmatians accepted to help the Scythians against the Persian attack, while the kings of the Agathyrsi, Androphagi, Melanchlaeni, Neuri, and Tauri refused to support the Scythians.

During the campaign, the Scythians and the Persian army pursuing them passed through the territories of the Melanchlaeni, Androphagi, and Neuri, before they reached the borders of the Agathyrsi, who refused to let the Scythian divisions to pass into their territories and find refuge there, thus forcing the Scythians to return to Scythia with the Persians pursuing them.

=== Later history ===
By the 4th century BC, most of the Melanchlaeni migrated to the south, where the settled around the Greek city of Pontic Olbia, where the Protogenes inscription, written sometime between 220 and 200 BC, mentioned them as the Saudaratae, which was a Hellenisation of their original Iranic name. According to the Protogenes inscription, the Scythians, the Thisamatae, the Saudaratae, and the Saii were seeking refuge from the allied forces of the Celts and the Germanic Sciri.

The Saudaratae were still living around Pontic Olbia in the 1st century BC.

== Society and culture ==
Herodotus of Halicarnassus described the Melanchlaeni as being distinct from the Scythians while still following the same lifestyle as them. Herodotus also claimed that the Melanchlaeni all wore black clothes, from which was derived their name, which meant "black-cloaks."

== Society ==
=== Religion ===
The burial rites of the Melanchlaeni were connected to those of the Late Bronze Age cultures which had preceded them in the region of the middle Donets river, including the Bondarikha culture.

=== Lifestyle ===
The Melanchlaeni appear to have lived in a precarious situation, as evidenced by the large number of weapons found in their graves and their many defensive earthworks.

=== Language ===
The Donets group of the Scythian culture which corresponded to the Melanchlaeni was part of an area of Iranic toponymy and hydronymy.

The Melanchlaeni appear to have spoken a dialect of the Scythian languages. Unlike the dialect of the Pontic Scythians, where the sound /d/ had eventually evolved into /l/, the dialect of the Melanchlaeni had retained the sound /d/, as attested by their Iranic name, Sawdaratā.

== Ritual cannibalism ==
The remains of intact human bones discovered in seven earthworks of the Melanchlaeni and Budini suggests that these two tribes might have engaged in ritual cannibalism similarly to the Androphagi.

== Archaeology ==
The Melanchlaeni archaeologically belonged to the Scythian culture, and they corresponded to its Donets group, which extended over the basin of the upper Donets river in the Eastern European forest steppe zone.

The Donets, Sula and Vorskla groups of the Scythian culture, respectively corresponding to the Melanchlaeni, Androphagi, and Budini, are sometimes grouped the Zolnichnaya (that is "Ash-Mounds") culture because of the presence of several zolnyk (зольник), that is ash mounds containing refuse from kitchens and other sources, near dwellings. The three groups of the Zolnichnaya culture were closely related to each other, with the Vorskla group nevertheless exhibiting enough significant differences from the Sula and Donets groups that the latter two are sometimes grouped together as a Sula-Donets group distinct from the Vorskla group.

The earliest Scythians had belonged to the Srubnaya culture, and like the Sula group of the Scythian culture which corresponds to the Androphagi, the Donets group of the Scythian culture contained an important element of the Srubnaya culture in its substratum, although there were some differences between the Sula and Donets groups.

== See also ==
- European Scythian campaign of Darius I
- Melanchlaeni and Cheremis (Mari)

== Sources ==
- Barnett, R. D. (1991). "Urartu". In Boardman, John; Edwards, I. E. S.; Hammond, N. G. L.; Sollberger, E. (eds.). The Prehistory of the Balkans; and the Middle East and the Aegean world, tenth to eighth centuries B.C. The Cambridge Ancient History. Vol. 3. Cambridge, United Kingdom: Cambridge University Press. pp. 314–371. ISBN 978-1-139-05428-7.
- Batty, Roger (2007). Rome and the Nomads: The Pontic-Danubian Realm in Antiquity. Oxford: Oxford University Press. ISBN 978-0-198-14936-1.
- Bouzek, Jan [in Hungarian] (2001). "Cimmerians and Early Scythians: the Transition from Geometric to Orientalising Style in the Pontic Area". In Tsetskhladze, G.R. (ed.). North Pontic Archaeology: Recent Discoveries and Studies. Leiden, Netherlands: Brill Publishers. pp. 33–44. ISBN 978-9-004-12041-9.
- Diakonoff, I. M. (1985). "Media". In Gershevitch, Ilya (ed.). The Median and Achaemenian Periods. The Cambridge History of Iran. Vol. 2. Cambridge, United Kingdom: Cambridge University Press. ISBN 978-0-521-20091-2.
- Diakonoff, I. M. (1993). "Cyaxares". Encyclopædia Iranica. New York City, United States: Encyclopædia Iranica Foundation; Brill Publishers.
- Fol, Alexander; Hammond, N. G. L. (1988). "Persia in Europe, Apart from Greece". In Boardman, John; Hammond, N. G. L.; Lewis, D. M.; Ostwald, M. (eds.). Persian, Greece and the Western Mediterranean, c. 525 to 479 B.C. The Cambridge Ancient History. Vol. 4. Cambridge: Cambridge University Press. pp. 234–253. ISBN 978-0-521-22804-6.
- Harmatta, János (1996). "10.4.1. The Scythians". In Hermann, Joachim; Zürcher, Erik; Harmatta, János; Litvak, J. K.; Lonis, R. [in French]; Obenga, T.; Thapar, R.; Zhou, Yiliang (eds.). From the Seventh Century B.C. to the Seventh Century A.D. History of Humanity. Vol. 3. London, United Kingdom; New York City, United States; Paris, France: Routledge; UNESCO. ISBN 978-9-231-02812-0.
- Herodotus; Godolphin, Francis R. B. (1973). "Herodotus: On the Scythians". The Metropolitan Museum of Art Bulletin. 32 (5): 129–149. doi:10.2307/3269235. JSTOR 3269235.
- Ivantchik, Askold (1993a). Les Cimmériens au Proche-Orient [The Cimmerians in the Near East] (PDF) (in French). Fribourg, Switzerland; Göttingen, Germany: Éditions Universitaires Fribourg (Switzerland); Vandenhoeck & Ruprecht (Germany). ISBN 978-3-727-80876-0.
- Jacobson, Esther (1995). The Art of the Scythians: The Interpenetration of Cultures at the Edge of the Hellenic World. Leiden, Netherlands: Brill Publishers. ISBN 978-9-004-09856-5.
- Kullanda, Sergei [in Russian] (2014). "External relations of Scythian". Journal of Language Relationship. 11 (1). Piscataway, United States: Gorgias Press: 81–90. doi:10.31826/jlr-2014-110110.
- Melyukova, A. I. (1990). "The Scythians and Sarmatians". In Sinor, Denis (ed.). The Cambridge History of Early Inner Asia. Cambridge, United Kingdom: Cambridge University Press. pp. 97–117. ISBN 978-0-521-24304-9.
- Olbrycht, Marek Jan (2000a). "The Cimmerian Problem Re-Examined: the Evidence of the Classical Sources". In Pstrusińska, Jadwiga [in Polish]; Fear, Andrew (eds.). Collectanea Celto-Asiatica Cracoviensia. Kraków: Księgarnia Akademicka. pp. 71–100. ISBN 978-8-371-88337-8.
- Olbrycht, Marek Jan (2000b). "Remarks on the Presence of Iranian Peoples in Europe and Their Asiatic Relations". In Pstrusińska, Jadwiga [in Polish]; Fear, Andrew (eds.). Collectanea Celto-Asiatica Cracoviensia. Kraków: Księgarnia Akademicka. pp. 101–140. ISBN 978-8-371-88337-8.
- Phillips, E. D. (1972). "The Scythian Domination in Western Asia: Its Record in History, Scripture and Archaeology". World Archaeology. 4 (2): 129–138. doi:10.1080/00438243.1972.9979527. JSTOR 123971.
- Sulimirski, T. (1954). "Scythian Antiquities in Western Asia". Artibus Asiae. 17 (3). Ascona, Switzerland: Artibus Asiae Publishers: 282–318. doi:10.2307/3249059. JSTOR 3249059.
- Sulimirski, T. (1985). "The Scyths". In Gershevitch, I. (ed.). The Median and Achaemenian Periods. The Cambridge History of Iran. Vol. 2. Cambridge, United Kingdom: Cambridge University Press. pp. 149–199. ISBN 978-1-139-05493-5.
- Sulimirski, Tadeusz; Taylor, T. F. (1991). "The Scythians". In Boardman, John; Edwards, I. E. S.; Hammond, N. G. L.; Sollberger, E.; Walker, C. B. F. (eds.). The Assyrian and Babylonian Empires and other States of the Near East, from the Eighth to the Sixth Centuries B.C. The Cambridge Ancient History. Vol. 3. Cambridge, United Kingdom: Cambridge University Press. pp. 547–590. ISBN 978-1-139-05429-4.
