= Androphagi =

Ancient tribe described by Herodotus

The Androphagi were an ancient Scythian tribe whose existence was recorded by ancient Greco-Roman authors. They were closely related to the Melanchlaeni and the Budini.

== Name ==
The name Androphagi is a Latinisation of the ancient Greek name Androphagoi (Ancient Greek: Ἀνδροφάγοι), which means "man-eaters." This name is a descriptive one based on their reported practice of cannibalism; how they called themselves is unknown.

== Location ==
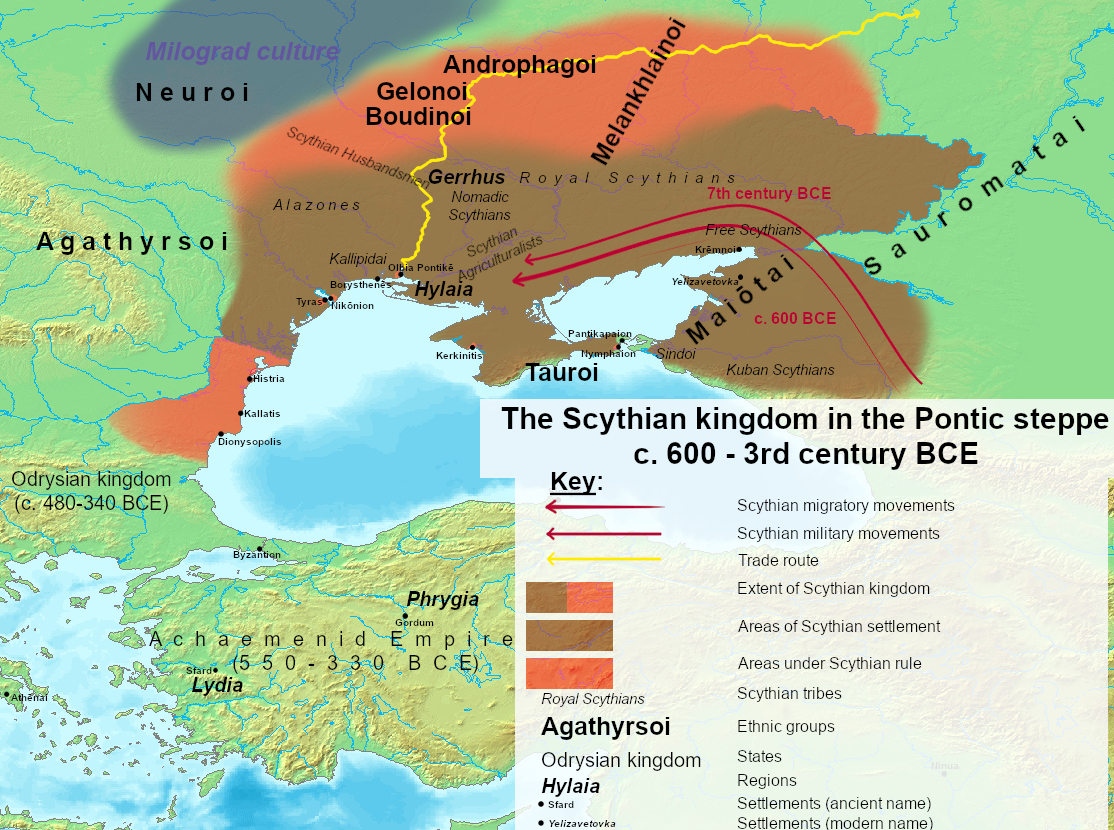
The location of the Androphagi in Scythia.

The Androphagi lived in the region to the east of the middle Dnieper river, especially in the valley of the Sula and some smaller rivers. Their neighbours were the Neuri to the west and the Scythians proper to the south.

== History ==
The Scythians originated in the region of the Volga-Ural steppes of Central Asia, possibly around the 9th century BC. Over the course of the 8th and 7th centuries BC, they migrated into the Caucasian and Caspian Steppes in several waves, becoming the dominant population of the region. The section of the Scythians from whom the Androphagi originated participated in this migration and had established itself in North Caucasus around 800 BC.

Beginning in the later 7th and lasting throughout much of the 6th century BC, the majority of the Scythians migrated from the North Caucasus into the Pontic–Caspian steppe, which became the centre of Scythian power. In the region of Donets-Kramatorsk, the Vorskla and Sula-Donets subgroups of the Scythian culture emerged. Of these, the Donets group corresponded to the Melanchlaeni, the Sula group to the Androphagi, and the Vorskla group to the Budini, with all of these groups remaining independent of the Scythians proper.

When the Persian Achaemenid king Darius I attacked the Scythians in 513 BC, the Scythian king Idanthyrsus summoned the kings of the peoples surrounding his kingdom to a meeting to decide how to deal with the Persian invasion. The kings of the Budini, Gelonians, and Sarmatians agreed to support the Scythians against the attack, while the kings of the Agathyrsi, Androphagi, Melanchlaeni, Neuri, and Tauri refused to help.

== Society and culture ==
The ancient Greek author Herodotus described the Androphagi as wearing Scythian-type clothing, and speaking a "peculiar language." This might have been a Scythian language or dialect different from that of the Pontic Scythians.

The Androphagi were largely engaged in agriculture and farming, and hunting was of lesser importance among them. Trade relations between them and the ancient Greek colonies on the northern shores of the Black Sea had been established in the 6th century BC. Herodotus described them as savage and lawless, possibly reflecting strained relations with Olbian Greek traders who traversed their territory along a major trade route.

=== Cannibalism ===
According to Herodotus, the Androphagi ate human flesh, while the surrounding peoples did not. Evidence supporting this was found in the form of human bones disposed together with cut and broken animal bones in the kitchen refuse of seven earthworks belonging to the Sula group (associated with the Androphagi) and the neighbouring Vorskla group (Budini). Similar evidence of cannibalism was found among the Sauromatians who lived in the Urals, as well as in the Smiela kurgan 15, one of the earliest burials of the Tiasmyn group of the Scythian culture. Hence the practice seems to have been more widespread than Herodotus suggested.

== Archaeology ==
The Androphagi archaeologically belonged to the Scythian culture, and they corresponded to its Sula group, which was the largest Scythian culture group of the eastern European forest steppe zone.

The Donets, Sula and Vorskla groups of the Scythian culture, respectively corresponding to the Melanchlaeni, Androphagi, and Budini, are sometimes grouped the Zolnichnaya (that is "Ash-Mounds") culture because of the presence of several zolnyk (зольник), that is ash mounds containing refuse from kitchens and other sources, near dwellings. The three groups of the Zolnichnaya culture were closely related to each other, with the Vorskla group nevertheless exhibiting enough significant differences from the Sula and Donets groups that the latter two are sometimes grouped together as a Sula-Donets group distinct from the Vorskla group.

== See also ==
- Cannibalism in Europe

== Sources ==
- Batty, Roger (2007). Rome and the Nomads: The Pontic-Danubian Realm in Antiquity. Oxford: Oxford University Press. ISBN 978-0-198-14936-1.
- Herodotus; Godolphin, Francis R. B. (1973). "Herodotus: On the Scythians". The Metropolitan Museum of Art Bulletin. 32 (5): 129–149. doi:10.2307/3269235. JSTOR 3269235.
- Olbrycht, Marek Jan (2000). "Remarks on the Presence of Iranian Peoples in Europe and Their Asiatic Relations". In Pstrusińska, Jadwiga; Fear, Andrew (eds.). Collectanea Celto-Asiatica Cracoviensia. Kraków: Księgarnia Akademicka. pp. 101–140. ISBN 978-8-371-88337-8.
- Sulimirski, Tadeusz (1985). "The Scyths". In Gershevitch, Ilya (ed.). The Median and Achaemenian Periods. The Cambridge History of Iran. Vol. 2. Cambridge, UK: Cambridge University Press. pp. 149–199. ISBN 978-1-139-05493-5.
- Sulimirski, Tadeusz; Taylor, Timothy F. (2008). "The Scythians". In Boardman, John; Edwards, I. E. S.; Sollberger, E.; Hammond, N. G. L. (eds.). The Assyrian and Babylonian Empires and other States of the Near East, from the Eighth to the Sixth Centuries B.C. The Cambridge Ancient History. Vol. 3, part 2 (2 ed.). Cambridge, UK: Cambridge University Press. pp. 547–590. ISBN 978-1-139-05429-4.
