= Gelonians =

Ancient Scythian people

The Gelonians or Geloni were an ancient Scythian people of ancient Greek origin whose existence was recorded by ancient Graeco-Roman authors.

== Location ==
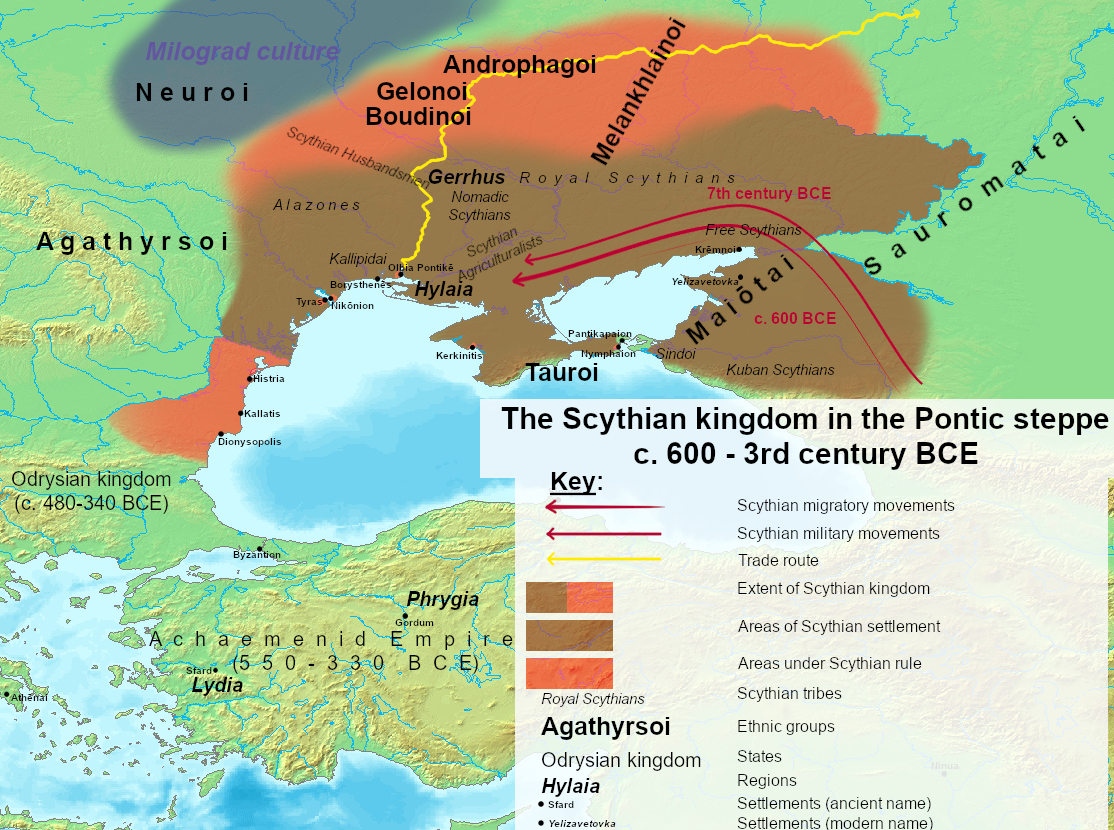
The location of the Budini near Scythia.

The Gelonians lived alongside the Budini in the valley of the Vorskla river.

== History ==
=== Origins ===
According to the 5th-century BC Greek historian Herodotus in Book 4 of The Histories, the Gelonians were originally Greeks who left from their trading ports along the northern coast of the Black Sea and settled among the nomadic Budini. Herodotus explicitly contrasts the Gelonians with their nomadic neighbours, noting that while the Budini were nomads with distinct physical traits (described as red-haired and bright-eyed), the Gelonians were agriculturalists who cultivated crops, maintained gardens, and consumed grain. Culturally, the Gelonians retained numerous Greek traditions. They built wooden temples and shrines dedicated to the Greek pantheon, adorned them in the traditional Greek manner, and celebrated festivals in honor of Dionysus. Linguistic hybridity also characterized the population; Herodotus observes that the Gelonians spoke a language that was "half Greek and half Scythian".

According to Tadeusz Sulimirski the Geloni likely originated as a group as the Scythians proper who lived in the Pontic steppe, due to which their name appears in the Scythian genealogical myth along with the Agathyrsi.

Like the Agathyrsi, the Gelonians lived outside of Scythia and were independent of the Scythian kingdom.

=== Gelonus ===
During the 6th century BC, the city of Gelonus was built in the country of the Budini, where the Gelonians set up an important industrial, commercial, and political centre. The Gelonians and Budini both lived in Gelonus, although each population lived in separate sections of the city: the Gelonians lived in the eastern earthwork, were was located the city's industrial, commercial, and political centre; the poorer native Budini lived in the western earthwork.

=== The Persian invasion ===
When the Persian Achaemenid king Darius I attacked the Scythians in 513 BC, the Scythian king Idanthyrsus summoned the kings of the peoples surrounding his kingdom to a meeting to decide how to deal with the Persian invasion. The kings of the Budini, Gelonians and Sarmatians accepted to help the Scythians against the Persian attack, while the kings of the Agathyrsi, Androphagi, Melanchlaeni, Neuri, and Tauri refused to support the Scythians.

During the campaign, Darius captured the city of Gelonus and set it on fire.

== Society and culture ==
=== Appearance ===
According to Herodotus of Halicarnassus, the Geloni were different in appearance from the Budini who lived alongside them.

=== Lifestyle ===
The sedentary Gelonians were wealthier than the nomadic Budini, and they were engaged in agriculture.

The Gelonians lived in the city of Gelonus, which was built entirely of wood, This city was protected by a defensive system of three earthworks surrounded by ramparts. The present-day site of Bilsk has been identified with Gelonus.

=== Language ===
The Gelonians were described by Herodotus of Halicarnassus as speaking a different language from the Budini.

=== Religion ===
Herodotus of Halicarnassus mentioned that, every three years, the Gelonians performed a Bacchic-type festival which he interpreted as a festival to the Greek god Dionysos.

Herodotus also claimed that the Gelonians built sanctuaries to their gods (whom he claimed were Greek gods), although this has not been archaeologically verified yet. This was in contrast to the Scythians proper, who did not built shrines to their gods.

=== Crafts ===
The Gelonians and Budini brought ores from outside to the industrial section of the city of Gelonus, where iron and copper were smelted from them.

=== Trade ===
The Gelonians and the Budini participated in the ancient trade route which started from the ancient Greek colony of Pontic Olbia on the northern shore of the Black Sea and continued to the north-east into the steppe and forest-steppe regions.

== Archaeology ==
The Gelonians corresponded to a group of the archaeological Scythian culture which was located outside of Scythia.

== Sources ==
- Braund, David (2021). "Heracles' Footprint by the River Tyras: Immortality and Acculturation on the Geto-Scythian Frontier". In Braund, David; Stolba, Vladimir F.; Peter, Ulrike (eds.). Environment and Habitation around the Ancient Black Sea. Berlin, Germany: De Gruyter. p. 177-194. ISBN 978-3-110-71570-5.
- Cunliffe, Barry (2019). The Scythians: Nomad Warriors of the Steppe. Oxford, United Kingdom; New York City, United States: Oxford University Press. ISBN 978-0-198-82012-3.
- Herodotus; Godolphin, Francis R. B. (1973). "Herodotus: On the Scythians". The Metropolitan Museum of Art Bulletin. 32 (5): 129–149. doi:10.2307/3269235. JSTOR 3269235.
- Parzinger, Hermann (2004). Die Skythen [The Scythians] (in German). Munich, Germany: Verlag C.H.Beck. ISBN 978-3-406-50842-4.
- Sulimirski, T. (1985). "The Scyths". In Gershevitch, I. (ed.). The Median and Achaemenian Periods. The Cambridge History of Iran. Vol. 2. Cambridge, United Kingdom: Cambridge University Press. pp. 149–199. ISBN 978-1-139-05493-5.
- Sulimirski, Tadeusz; Taylor, T. F. (1991). "The Scythians". In Boardman, John; Edwards, I. E. S.; Hammond, N. G. L.; Sollberger, E.; Walker, C. B. F. (eds.). The Assyrian and Babylonian Empires and other States of the Near East, from the Eighth to the Sixth Centuries B.C. The Cambridge Ancient History. Vol. 3. Cambridge, United Kingdom: Cambridge University Press. pp. 547–590. ISBN 978-1-139-05429-4.
