= Scythian campaign of Darius I =

Achaemenid expedition into Scythia

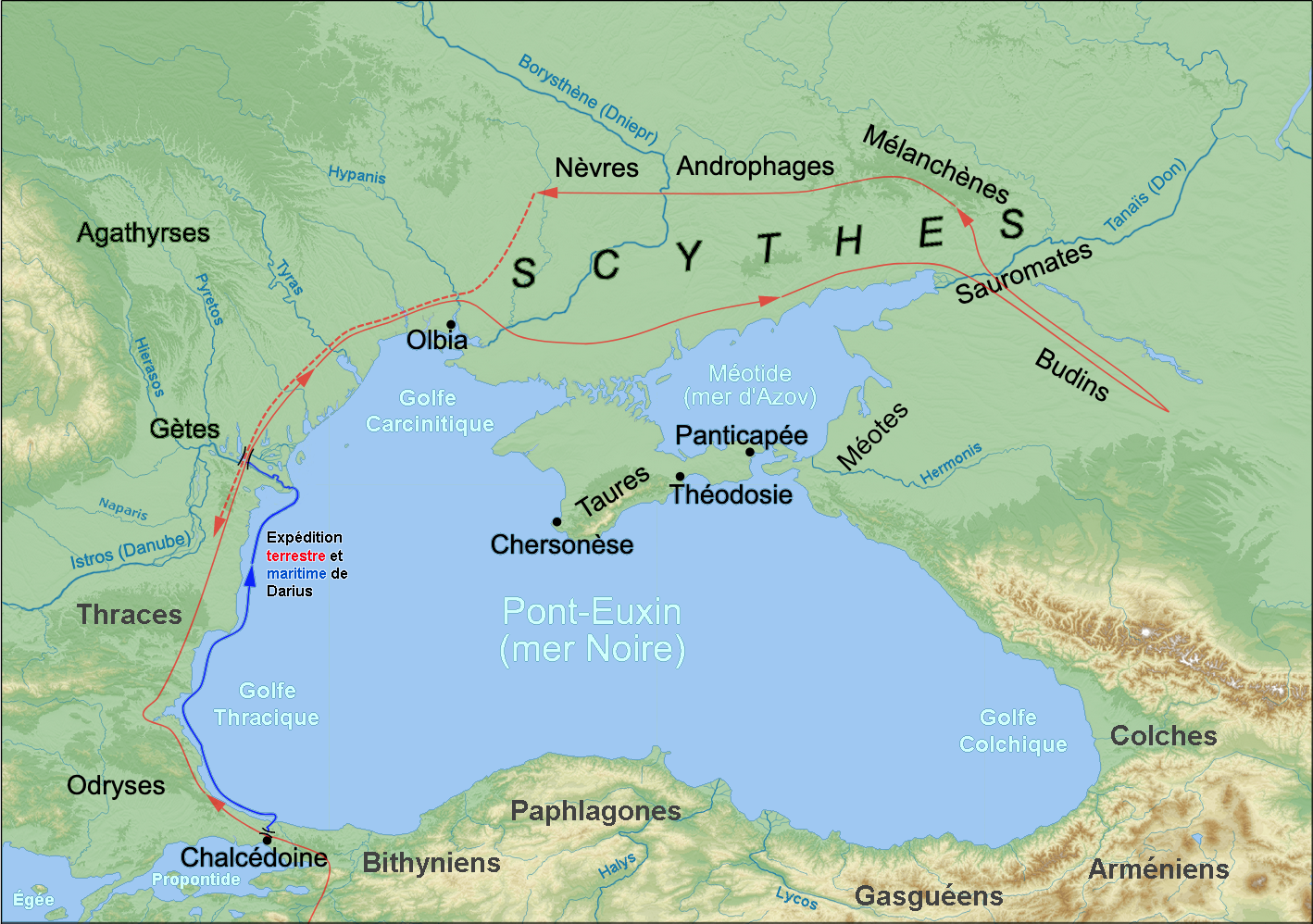
- Map of the European Scythian campaign of Darius I
Date	513 BC
Location	Balkans, the Black Sea Lowland (modern Ukraine)
Result	Persian victory: The Persians succeeded in reducing the Scythian threat and inflicted damage upon them

Belligerents
Achaemenid Empire	Royal Scythians

Commanders and leaders
Darius I; Megabazus	Idanthyrsus

Strength
700,000 total (Herodotus)	Unknown number of Scythian horsemen

Casualties and losses
620,000 (Herodotus)	unknown

The Scythian campaign of Darius I was a military expedition into parts of European Scythia by Darius I, the king of the Achaemenid Empire, in 513 BC. The Scythians were an East Iranian-speaking people who had invaded Media, revolted against Darius and threatened to disrupt trade between Central Asia and the shores of the Black Sea as they lived between the Danube and Don Rivers and the Black Sea. The campaigns took place in parts of what is now the Balkans, Ukraine, and southern Russia.

The Scythians managed to avoid a direct confrontation with the Persian army due to their mobile lifestyle and lack of any settlement (except Gelonus), while the Persians suffered losses due to the Scythians' scorched earth tactic. However, the Persians conquered much of their cultivated lands and damaged their allies, forcing the Scythians to respect the Persian force. Darius halted the advance to consolidate his gains, and built a defence line.

Practically everything that is known of this campaign is from Herodotus's book The Histories; almost no Persian sources exist, and no Scythian ones. It is difficult to know for sure how much of Herodotus's account is accurate.

== The campaign ==
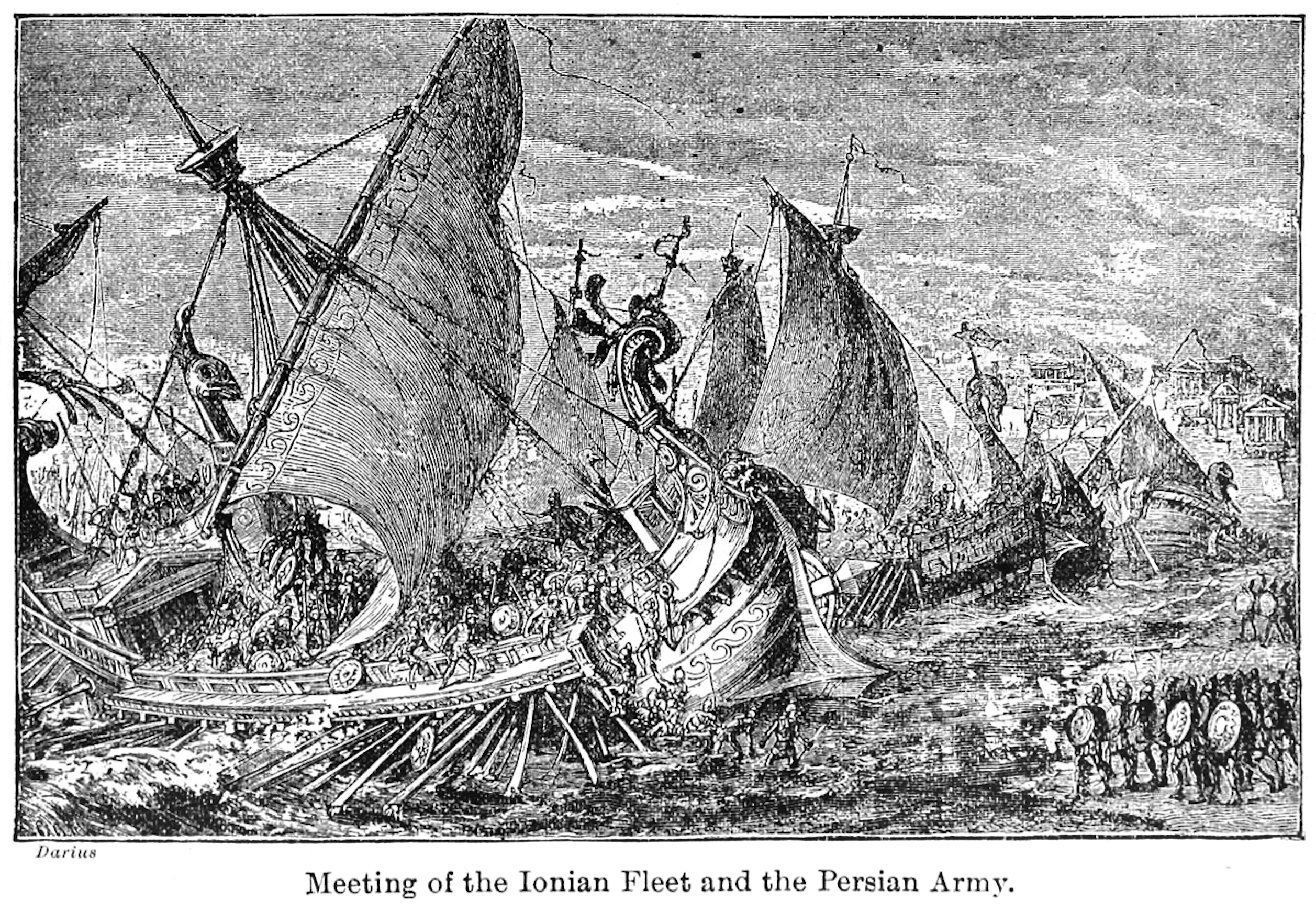
Junction of the Ionian fleet and the Persian army at the Bosphorus, in preparation for the Scythian campaign. 19th century illustration.

Darius crossed the Black Sea at the Bosphorus Straits using a bridge of boats. Darius conquered large portions of Eastern Europe, even crossing the Danube to wage war on the Scythians. Darius invaded Scythia with his general Megabazus, where the Scythians evaded Darius's army, using feints and retreating eastwards while laying waste to the countryside, by blocking wells, intercepting convoys, destroying pastures and continuous skirmishes against Darius's army. Seeking to fight with the Scythians, Darius's army chased the Scythian army deep into Scythian lands, mostly in what is modern-day Ukraine, where there were no cities to conquer and no supplies to forage. In frustration Darius sent a letter to the Scythian ruler Idanthyrsus to fight or surrender. The ruler replied that he would not stand and fight with Darius, unless the Persians found and desecrated the graves of the Scythians' forefathers. Until then, they would continue their strategy as they had no cities or cultivated lands to lose. Despite the evading tactics of the Scythians, Darius' campaign was so far relatively successful. As presented by Herodotus, the tactics of the Scythians resulted in the loss of their best lands and damage to their loyal allies. The fact is thus that Darius held the initiative. As he moved eastwards in the cultivated lands of the Scythians, he remained resupplied by his fleet and lived to an extent off of the land.

While moving eastwards in the European Scythian lands, he captured Gelonos, the large fortified city of the Budini, one of the allies of the Scythians, and burnt it.

=== Towards the end of the campaign ===
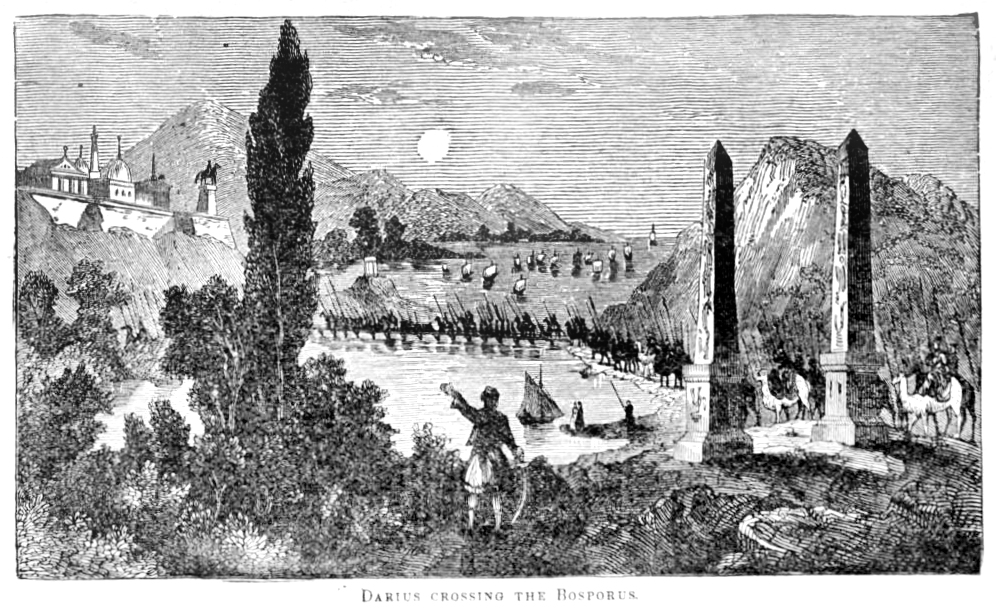
Darius crossing the Bosphorus.

Achaemenid Empire at its greatest extent under Darius I

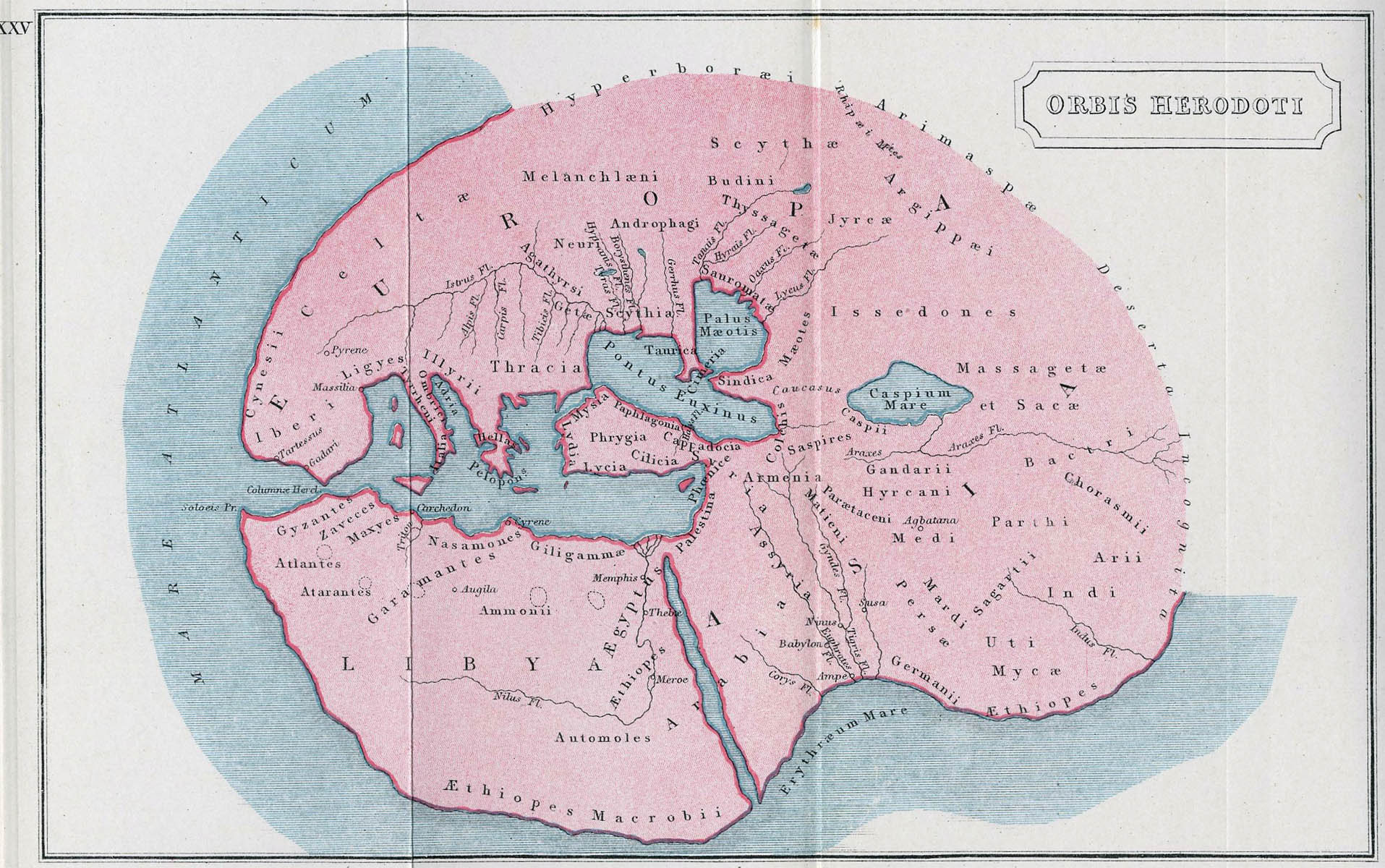
Map of the world based on Herodotus' Histories

Darius ordered a halt at the banks of Oarus, where he built "eight great forts, some eight miles distant from each other", no doubt as a frontier defence. As A. Fol and N. G. L. Hammond state, this evidently was as far eastwards as Darius intended to go, at least for the time being. After chasing the Scythians for a month, Darius's army was suffering losses due to fatigue, privation and sickness. In his Histories, Herodotus states that the ruins of the forts were still standing in his day. Concerned about losing more of his troops, Darius halted the march at the banks of the Volga River and headed towards Thrace. He had failed to bring the Scythians to a direct battle, and until he did so he did not have much reason to secure the conquered territories. The initiative still lay with him. As the tactics of evading Darius' army and scorched earth were continued by the Scythians, they had failed however completely, though Darius had failed too as still he wasn't able to bring it to a direct confrontation. He had conquered enough Scythian territory to force the Scythians to respect the Persian forces.

== Further reasons behind the invasion past the Danube ==
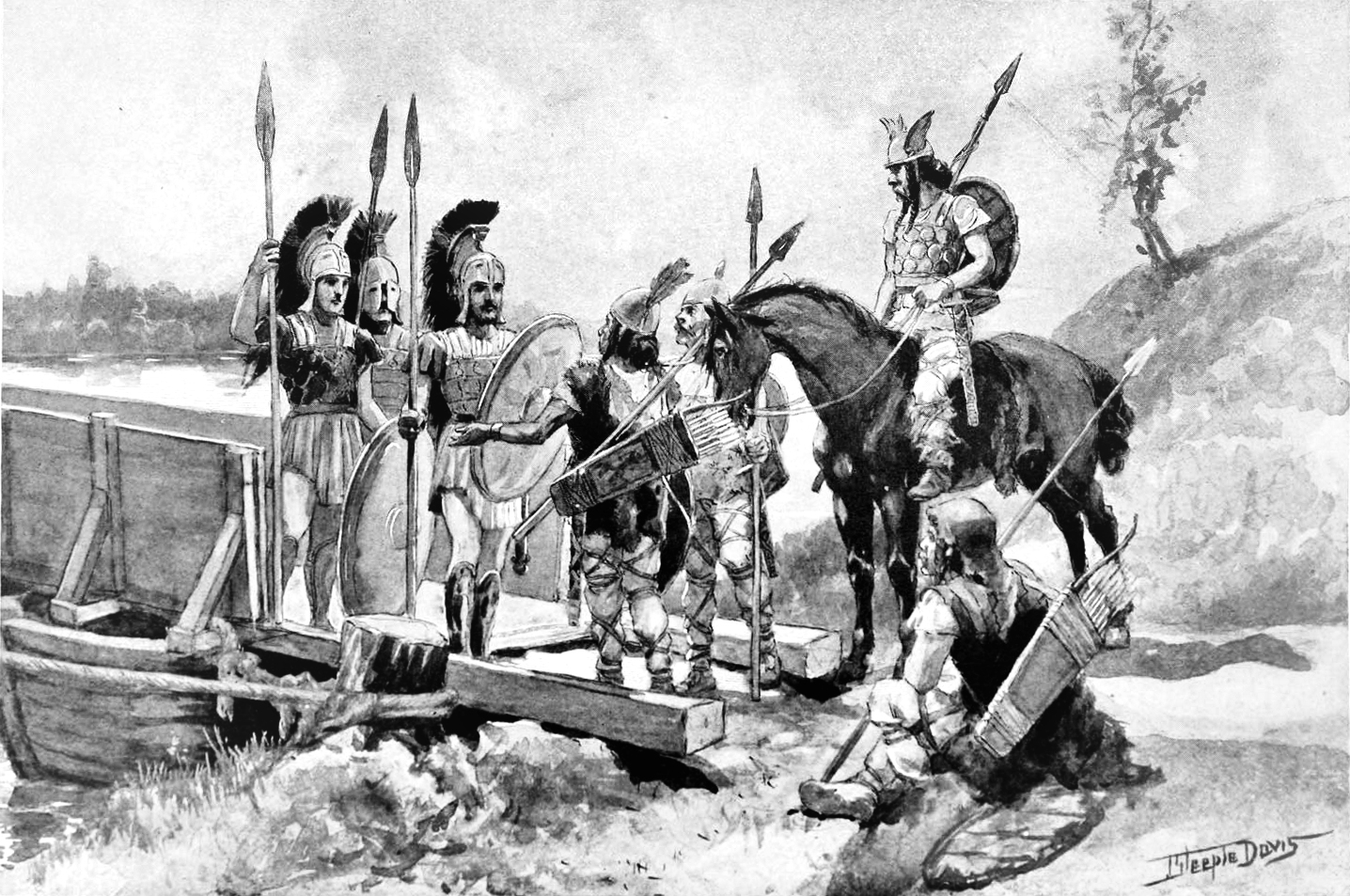
The Greeks of Histiaeus preserve the bridge of Darius I across the Danube. 19th century illustration.

The whole area from central Thrace to Georgia and from Ukraine to the north-east Mediterranean formed a compact area with mutual economic interests between Scythians, Thracians or Ionians, and Iranians. In strategic terms, Darius must have seen that some Scythian-type peoples extended from Ukraine all the way to what is modern-day Uzbekistan, forming a continuum of dangerous nomadic raiders. Furthermore, control of the Black Sea recognized no international divisions. The Persians and the Greeks (many of whom lived in the Persian Empire, while another number lived in the Greek colonies in what is nowadays southern Ukraine) had a common interest in seeking to control the source of Scythian exports of gold, grain, hides, and furs. As Fol and Hammond further state, Ctesias, a Greek doctor at the Persian court c. 400 BC, wrote that before the invasion of Darius into the European Scythian lands a satrap of Cappadocia named Ariaramnes had crossed the Black Sea to the north, raiding the European Scythian regions with a fleet of thirty penteconters, returning with Scythian men and women, including the brother of a Scythian king.

While some have supposed that the reason for Darius' invasions was merely to destroy the Scythian lands, the erection of a bridge over the Hellespont contradicts this; his superior fleet could have easily shipped the troops over as the Scythians had no navy at all.

== Date of the invasion ==
Though Herodotus does not mention the season of the year, as Fol and Hammond write, it is possible to infer it, knowing that if Darius marched from Susa in spring 513 BC, he would have reached Chalcedon in May, and mustered his forces on the European side in June. Thus, he may have started to go beyond the Danube in late August.

== Aftermath ==
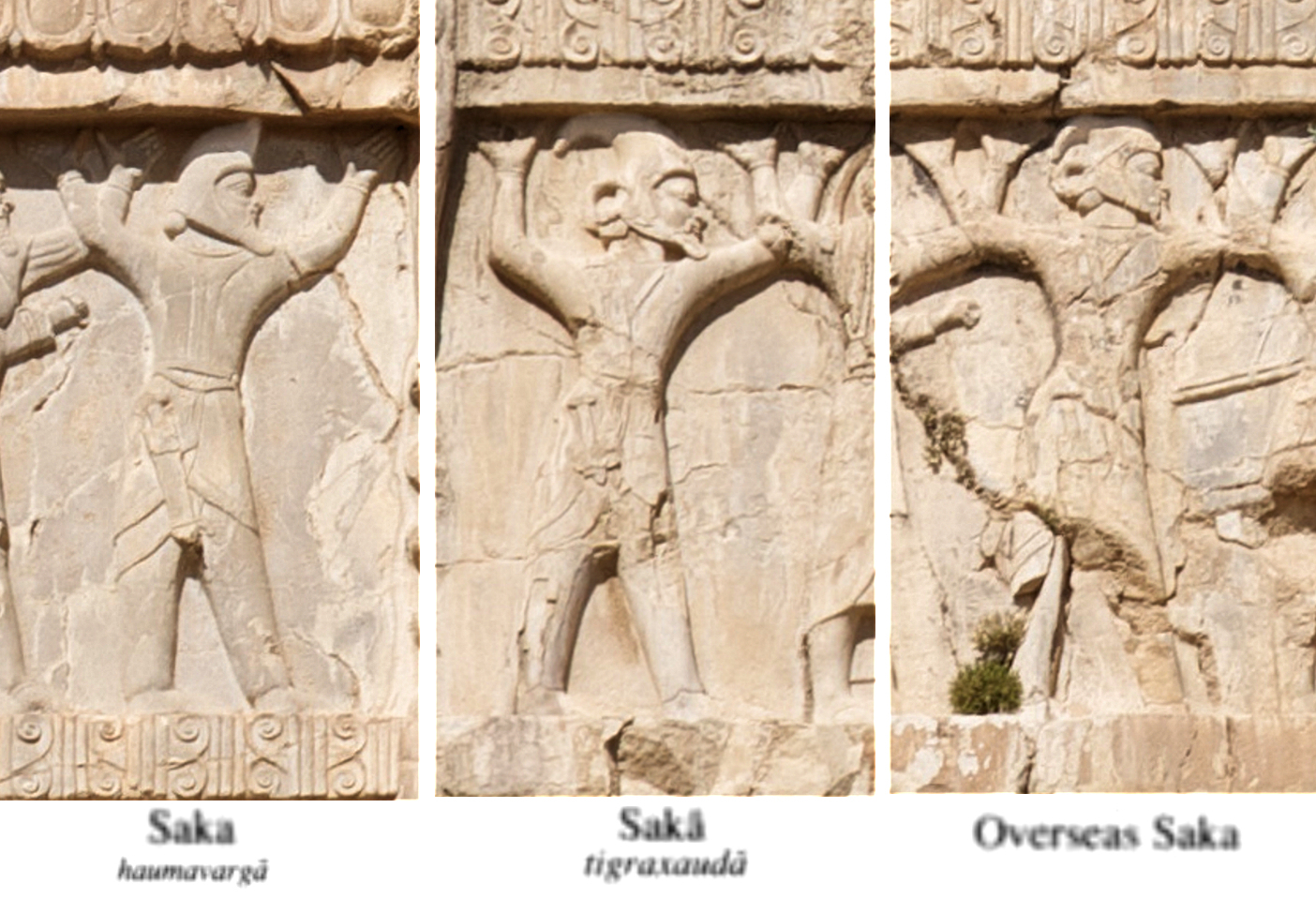
A Persian rock relief dating to the 5th century BCE depicting soldiers from various Scythian tribes serving in the Achaemenid (Persian) army as representatives of conquered nations; from left to right: a Haumavargā Scythian (Amyrgian), a Tigraxaudā Scythian (Massagetae), and a Scythian from beyond the sea (Black Sea region)

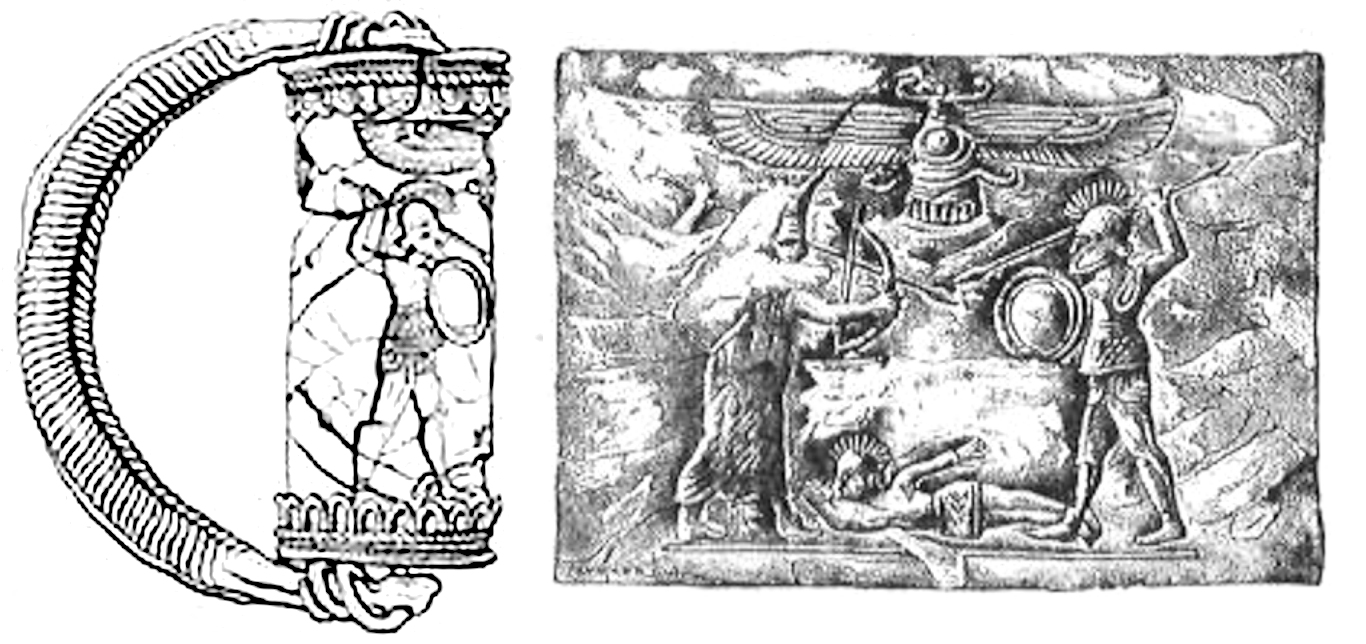
Achaemenid king fighting hoplites, seal and seal holder, Cimmerian Bosporus.

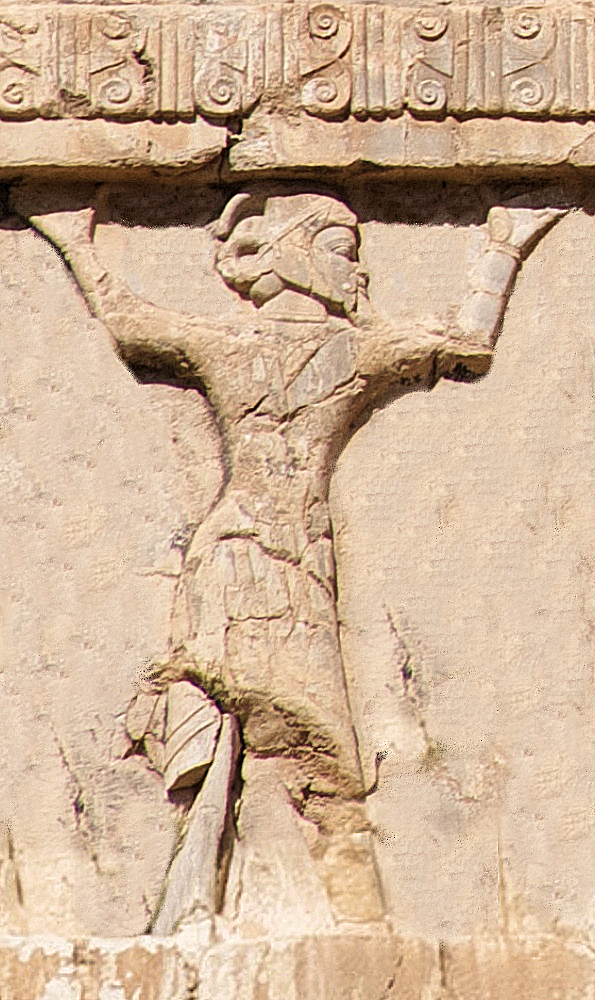
"Scythian across the Sea", depicted as a soldier of the Achaemenid army circa 480 BCE on the tomb of Xerxes I at Naqsh-e Rustam.

Darius inflicted widespread damage on the Scythians and their allies, weakened the prestige of the Royal Scythians especially, and upset the balance of power among the various peoples of the region. However, he suffered very heavy losses and did not fulfill the tasks set for the campaign. He failed to bring the Scythians to battle, he was unable to secure any territorial gains and he did not even complete the building of the forts at what could have been a frontier. The campaign was little more than an expensive stalemate. As winter now had come, Darius did not return to attack, and marched towards Thrace, towards his firmly secured territories.

Some form of Persian authority perhaps remained after Darius withdrew, for the "Scythians across the Sea" (Old Persian cuneiform: 𐎿𐎣𐎠𐏐𐎫𐎹𐎡𐎹𐏐𐎱𐎼𐎭𐎼𐎹, Sakā tayaiya paradraya) are mentioned at Naqsh-e Rustam as one of the peoples the king conquered outside of Persia, and János Harmatta was of the opinion that the Persian expedition had instead successfully annexed Scythia, and that the Scythians were able to free themselves only in 496 BC, when the Achaemenids lost all their European territories due to the Ionian Revolt.

== Involved groups ==
Allied groups to the Scythians included the Tauri, Agathyrsi, Neuri, Androphagi, Melanchlaeni, Budini & Gelonians, Sauromatae, and Getae. Other Ionians mentioned as being involved included Aiaces of Samos, Laodamas of Phocaea, Aristagoras of Cymae, Daphnis of Abydos, Hippoclus of Lampsacus, Herophantus of Parium, Metrodorus of Proconnesus, Aristagoras of Cyzicus, and Ariston of Byzantium.

== Assessment ==
The Scythian campaign was decisive in that the Persians abandoned the attempt to subjugate the European Scythians. Herodotus was correct in his assessment that the Scythians owed their escape to their mobility, their lack of inhabited centres, and the skill of their mounted archers. He furthermore states that their refusal to submit to Persia was due to such factors as the authoritarian power of the kings, the widespread hatred of foreigners (IV.76.1), and the ordinary man's belief that what brought him and his tribe honour was the killing of enemies. The various Scythian tribes co-operated with each other, winning support of other neighboring peoples as well. In that regard, they showed more of a sense of a community than the Greek city-states were to show through much of the subsequent Greco-Persian Wars.

== See also ==
- Scythia
- History of Ukraine
- History of the Balkans
- Gherla
- Achaemenid Macedonia
- First Persian invasion of Greece
- Gog and Magog

== Sources ==
- Beckwith, Christopher I. (2009). Empires of the Silk Road: A History of Central Eurasia from the Bronze Age to the Present. Princeton University Press.
- Boardman, John, ed. (1982). The Cambridge Ancient History. Vol. 10: Persia, Greece, and the Western Mediterranean. Cambridge: Cambridge University Press. pp. 239–243. ISBN 978-0521228046.
- Chaliand, Gérard (2014). A Global History of War: From Assyria to the Twenty-first Century. Translated by Mangin-Woods, Michelle; Woods, David. Oakland, CA: University of California Press. ISBN 9780520283602.
- Gulyaev, Valeri (2005). Скифы: расцвет и падение царства [Scythians: the rise and fall of the state] (in Russian). Алетейа.
- Harmatta, János (1999). "Herodotus, Historian of the Cimmerians and the Scythians". In Reverdin, Olivier [in French]; Nenci, Giuseppe [in Italian] (eds.). Hérodote et les Peuples Non Grecs [Herodotus and the non-Greek Peoples] (in French). Vandœuvres, Switzerland: Fondation Hardt pour l'étude de l'Antiquité classique. pp. 115–130. ISBN 978-3-774-92415-4.
- Herodotus, ed. (2015). The Histories. Knopf Doubleday Publishing Group. p. 352. ISBN 978-0375712715.
- Kuznetsova, Tatyana (1992). Скифы: Хрестоматия [Scythians: Chrestomathy] (in Russian). Moscow university press. ISBN 5-06-002442-3.
- Shahbazi, Shapur (1996), "Darius I the Great", Encyclopedia Iranica, vol. VII, New York: Columbia University
- Vasilev, Miroslav Ivanov (2015). The Policy of Darius and Xerxes towards Thrace and Macedonia. Leiden: Brill. ISBN 9004282157.
- Wells, H. G. (2004). The Outline of History: Prehistory to the Roman Republic. Barnes & Noble Library of Essential Reading. Vol. I (illustrated ed.). Barnes & Noble. ISBN 978-0-7607-5866-3.
