= Leipzig group =

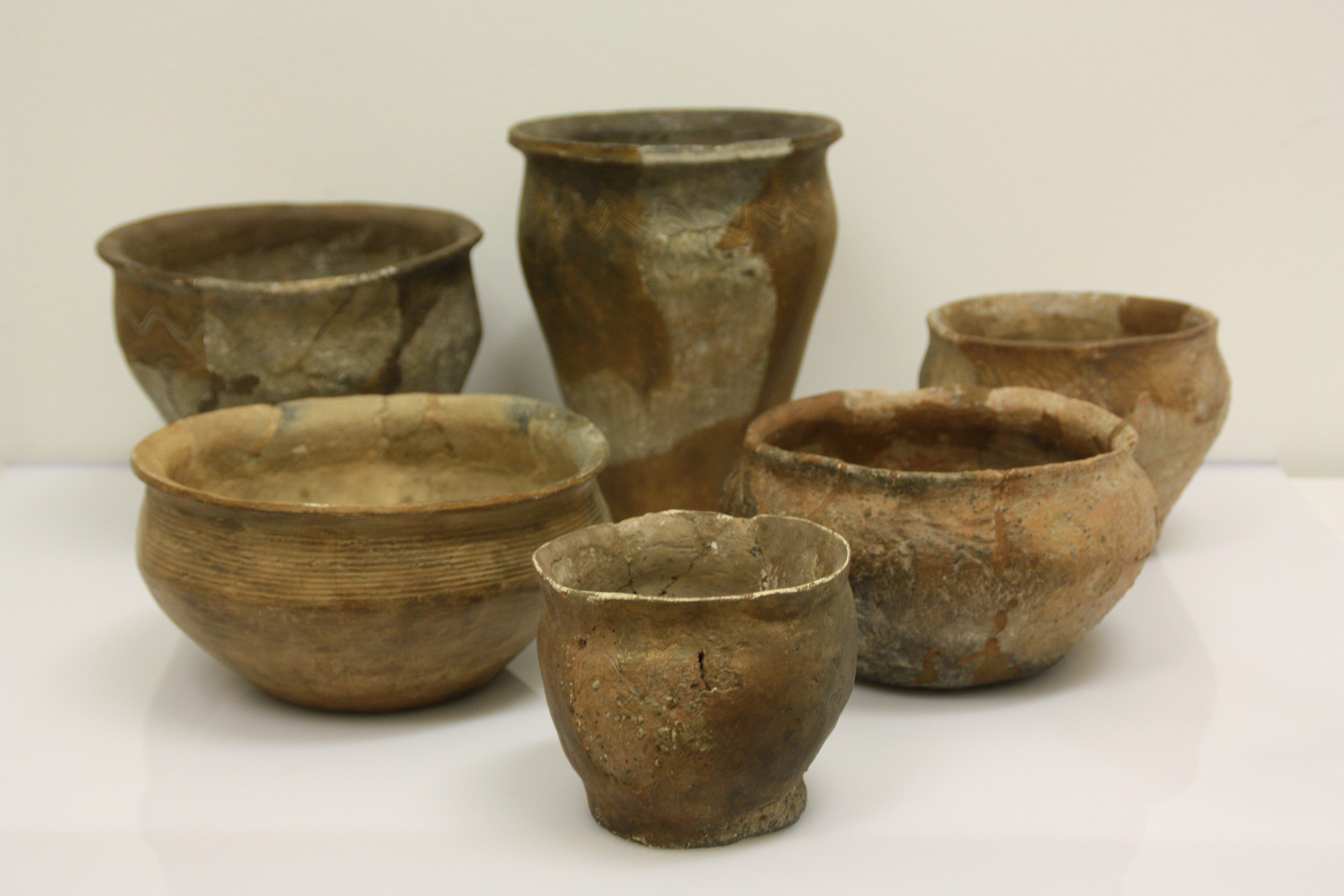
Ceramics of the Leipzig culture from Johannisberg, near Jena-Lobeda

The Leipzig group in archaeology refers to the Slavic pottery from the Early to High Middle Ages (from 7-8th to 13th century) in the Elbe-Saale area in today's state of Saxony, Saxony-Anhalt and Thuringia. It has four ceramic sub-groups or phases named after the eponymous sites of Rüssen, Rötha, Groitzsch and Kohren. It derives from Prague-Korchak culture. The group's area is considered to roughly correlate to the area of the Early Slavic tribe of Sorbs situated in Elbe-Mulde-Saale rivers valley.

== Research ==
The archaeological research of early medieval ceramics in the Elbe-Saale area had begun in the second half of the 19th century. The scientific excavations were carried with greater frequency since 1920s. Liesedore Langhammer in the 1950s was first to develop a ceramic stratigraphy. It had five layers named "A-E" roughly from 7-8th to 13th century, but results were unpublished and poorly noticed. Of considerable importance were excavations, stratigraphy, chronological and ethnic classification by Heinz-Joachim Vogt and Heinrich Rempel (1959–1968). Vogt developed in 1968 division into four groups or phases and introduced name Russen for oldest and Kohren for youngest group and by 1987 named second group Rotha and third as Groitzsch.

In the period of the 1960s–1980s in GDR became prevalent East German archaeologists' theorization which was ideologically and politically motivated, most prominently represented by its main opinion leader Joachim Herrmann (also advanced by Hansjürgen Brachmann). It was uncritically theorized ancient and early medieval origin of the Slavs on the territory of East Germany whereby the Slavs would be simultaneous or imminent migrants to the Germanic peoples and had almost the same cultural, societal and structural level of development. The model argued that archaeological differences and innovations were a product of immigration by ethnically homogenous groups and first incomers with hand-made pottery of Prague and Sukow-Dziedzice culture arrived in Southeast and Northeast East Germany in the late 5th or early 6th century which were followed by a 7th-century second wave of wheel-turned pottery of Leipzig, Tornow and Feldberg groups from Bohemia and Poland with presumably distinct and well defined tribal groups of Sorbs, Milzeni & Lusici, and Wilzi. It also made possible to claim Middle Danubian influence and origin of Leipzig's Rüssen-type dating it to the second half of the 6th century and "had in mind a potential parallel with the Serbs and Croats and the Balkans".

However, the old model's chronology and correlations were based on inadequate scientific methods which produced erroneous data and conclusions. All of them have been corrected and the old model literature is deemed outdated and has been rejected by modern archaeologists because of revised and new archaeological research of settlements, hillforts, house construction, graves, and pottery as well as radiocarbon dating, palynology, and dendrochronology since the 1980s which shows that the old model was "seriously wrong" and dated "two-three hundred years too early". In the case of Leipzig pottery, the majority of artifacts and sites are much younger than the attributed Rüssen phase. The types of pottery are not "specific for single Slavic tribes in its distribution" and "have no solid basis in written and archaeological evidence" (for example Tornow-type was also present on the assumed tribal territory of Leipzig-type). None of the datings of Slavic material in Southeast and especially Northeast part of East Germany show it was surely older than 700 AD while palynology shows that the land in the 6th and 7th centuries became forested and not well resettled by the Slavs. The earliest pre-hillfort settlement of the Slavs of Prague-type between Elbe and Saale is dated to the last third of the 6th century or around 600 or 700 AD, with the oldest settlements at Dessau-Mosigkau radiocarbon dating to 590 ± 80 AD. Different pottery types including Leipzig-type mainly represent a range of 8th century and later regional variations and introduction of new technologies that emerged from intercultural relations mostly by Carolingian and Ottonian era influence among already settled Slavs.

=== Chronology and terminology ===
The chronology and terminology is largely based on Vogt and Brachmann's but terminological confusion was introduced with Brachmann. In 1968 he divided the ceramics into only two groups, "grey" and "brown", and ten years later named the former as "Leipzig group". He summarized stratigraphically three separate horizons by Vogt into only one group. The name was eventually adopted, but were also kept Vogt's names for separate phases, types or sub-groups.

== Rüssen phase ==
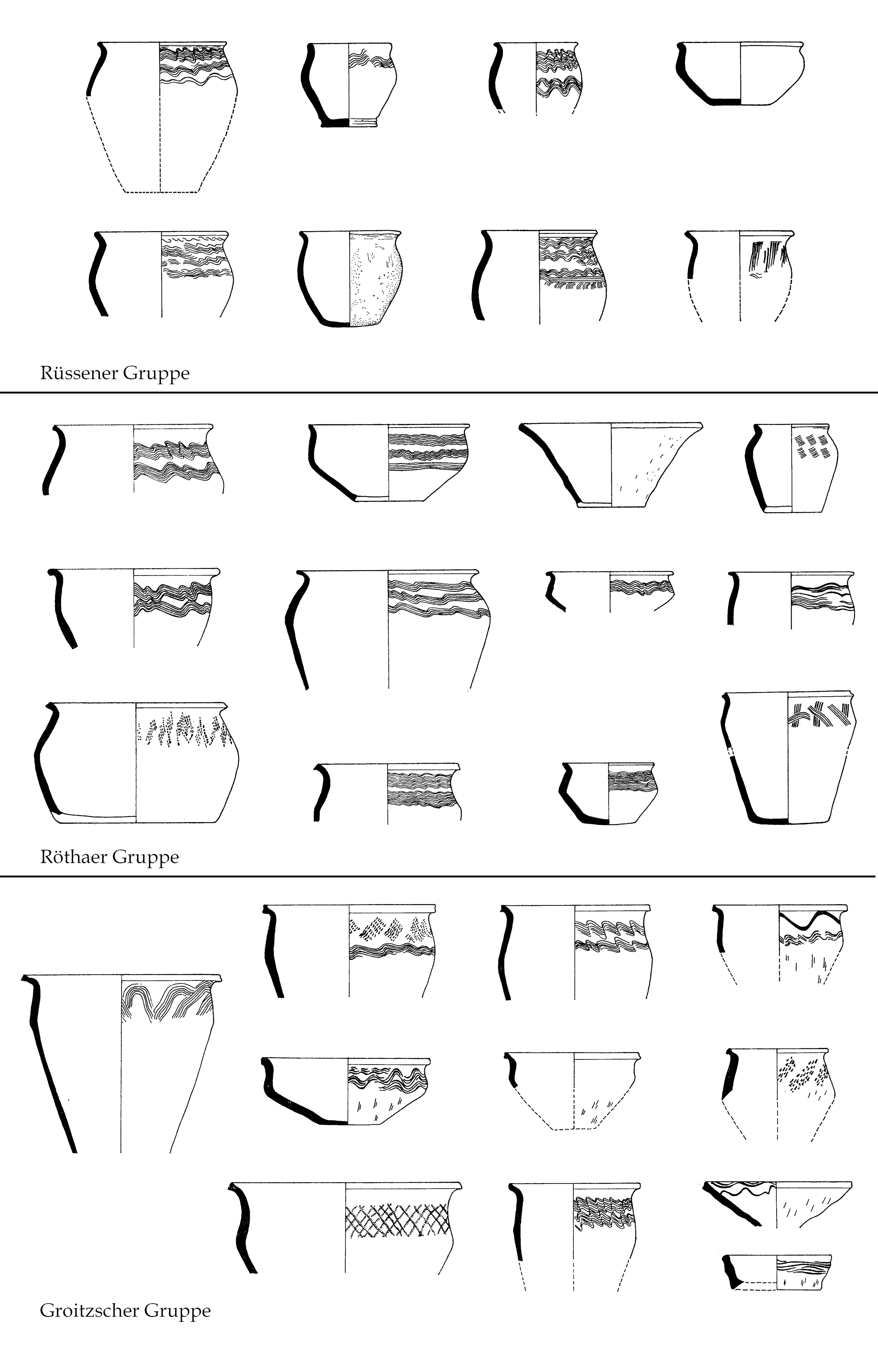
Typical vessels of the Rüssen, Rötha and Groitzscher group/phase of Leipzig ceramics

It is the Early Slavic phase or group and represents the older hillfort ceramics. Vogt suspected its beginning in the second half of the 6th century but as ceramics is mostly younger than the Prague-type hence dated it to the 7-8th century. Brachmann in 1994 considered it was produced since around 600 but also agreed with Vogt's dating to the 7-8th century; Timpel in 1995 from the second half of the 7th until the middle of the 8th century; Westphalen in 1996 around 8-9th century; Biermann in 2000 only in later 8th and 9th centuries; Barford in 2001 since late 6th century. Radiocarbon dating of one site dates to the 7th century, but dendrochronological dating revealed an age of 715 ± 10 AD. Another 14C dating from another site gave 680 ± 60 AD which partly confirmed the first date.

It preserved patterns of earlier Prague-Korchak material. The pottery is similar to contemporaneous Feldberg from East Germany, Raciborz-Chodlik from Southern Poland, and Luka-Raikovetska group from Western Ukraine. Decorative scheme possibly shows widespread "Danube-type" trend present in Bohemia and Moravia.

== Rötha phase ==
It is the Middle Slavic phase or group of hillfort ceramics, coinciding with the Franks pressure on Sorbs and formation of Limes Sorabicus until middle of the 10th century, most probably related to the Henry I's conquest in 928/929 AD. It differs only slightly from the Rüssen ceramics.

According to Vogt and Brachmann the transition from Rüssen to Rötha started in the middle of the 8th and 9th century; Westphalen from 9th century; Roslund since late 9th century. A number of metal finds show occurrence at least from mid to second half of the 9th century, and a 14C dating gave around 880 ± 60 AD. Its ceramics and metal is found in many castles dated to the end of the 8th and beginning of the 10th century, including from castle wall Cösitz near Zörbig related to the 839 AD account about the Sorabos, called Colodici, and the Johannisberg near Jena-Lobeda.

== Groitzscher phase ==
It is the Late Slavic phase or group of younger hillfort ceramics, from late 10th to the end of 11th century. Westphalen dated it until 13th century, but that period belongs to the successive phase.

== Kohren phase ==
Is the last Slavic phase or group. It lasted from 12th until 13th century, being a transition between Slavic and Germanic pottery. A 14C dating in one site gave 1120 ± 40 AD.

== See also ==
- Polabian Slavs
- Wends
