= Neuri =

Ancient tribe described by Herodotus

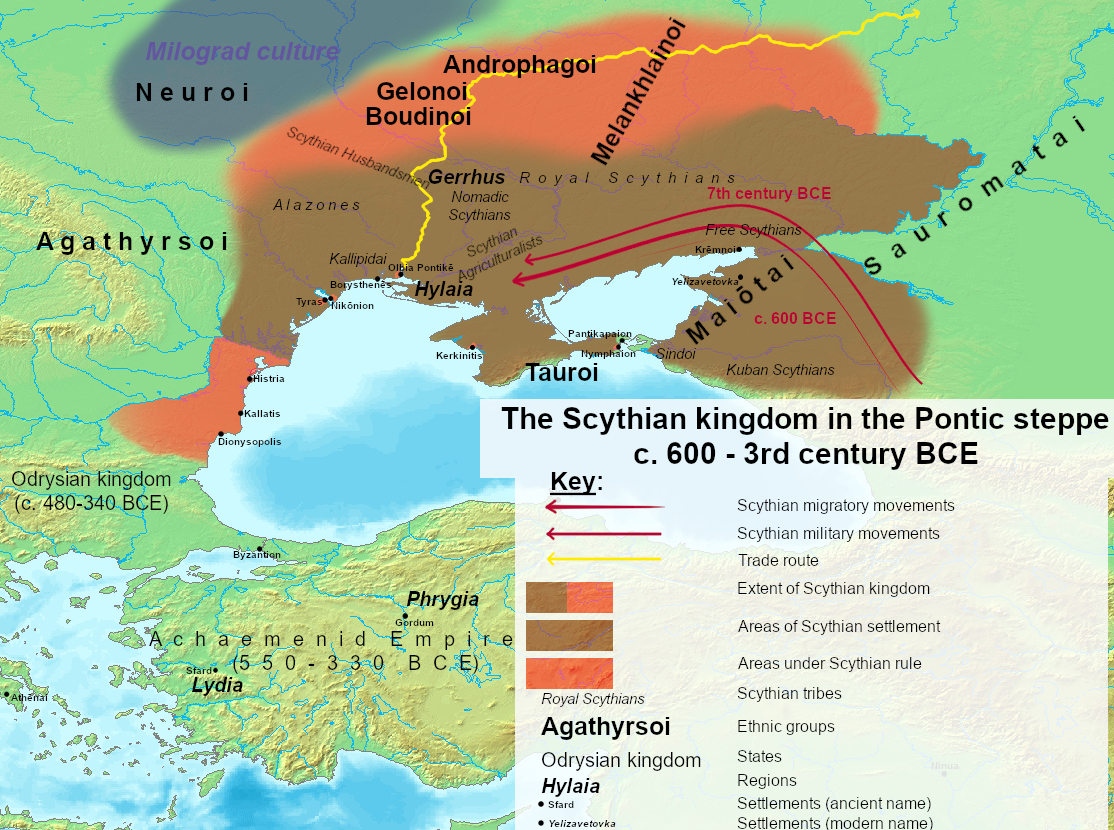
The location of the Neuri near Scythia.

The Neuri (Ancient Greek: Νευροί, romanized: Neuroí; Latin: Neuri) were an ancient Baltic people whose existence was recorded by ancient Graeco-Roman authors.

== Identification ==
The Neuri belonged to a larger group of Baltic peoples of which the only present-day members are Lithuanians and Latvians.

== Location ==
The Neuri lived in the region corresponding to present-day Belarus, in the territory including the Dzyasna, Prypyats, and middle Dnyapro rivers. To the south, the territory of the Neuri reached the upper section of the Southern Buh river.

The neighbours of the Neuri to the east of the Dnyapro river were the Androphagi, the Melanchlaeni, and the Budini as well as Finno-Ugric peoples. Their neighbours were the Agathyrsi to the south-west, and the Scythian tribe of the Aroteres to the south-east.

== History ==
The Neuri were independent of the Scythians.

According to Herodotus of Halicarnassus, the Neuri once had to leave their country because of an invasion of snakes.

When the Persian Achaemenid king Darius I attacked the Scythians in 513 BC, the Scythian king Idanthyrsus summoned the kings of the peoples surrounding his kingdom to a meeting to decide how to deal with the Persian invasion. The kings of the Budini, Gelonians and Sarmatians accepted to help the Scythians against the Persian attack, while the kings of the Agathyrsi, Androphagi, Melanchlaeni, Neuri, and Tauri refused to support the Scythians.

During the campaign, the Scythians and the Persian army pursuing them passed through the territories of the Melanchlaeni, Androphagi, and Neuri, before they reached the borders of the Agathyrsi, who refused to let the Scythian divisions to pass into their territories and find refuge there, thus forcing the Scythians to return to Scythia with the Persians pursuing them.

=== Legacy ===
The Neuri have left traces of their presence in the region of the Dzyasna, Prypyats, and middle Dnyapro rivers in the form of Baltic-derived hydronyms and toponyms which pre-date the migration of Slavic peoples into this area.

== Society ==
=== Culture ===
According to the Greek author Herodotus of Halicarnassus, the Neuri followed Scythian customs. This claim might have referred only to the southernmost sections of the Neuri, who were neighbours of the Scythian Aroteres tribe.

Herodotus also claimed that the Neuri "seemed to be magicians," and that all members of their tribe would allegedly each year would become a wolf for some days before being restored to their human form. This might suggest that the Neuri performed cults in which they wore wolf skins and masks, and that the wolf might have been a totem animal of this tribe.

== Archaeology ==
The Neuri archaeologically correspond to the Milograd culture.

The southernmost of part of the Milograd culture, which adjoined the territory of the Scythian Aroteres, included many Scythian elements.
