= Journal of World Prehistory =

- Discipline: Prehistory
- Language: English

Publication details
- Publisher: Springer Science+Business Media
- Impact factor: 3.240 (2020)

Standard abbreviations
- ISO 4: J. World Prehist.

Indexing
- ISSN: 0892-7537

Links
- Journal homepage; Online archive

The Journal of World Prehistory is a peer-reviewed academic journal covering research on prehistory worldwide, with a focus on original treatments of the prehistory of a specific area or larger region. It is published by Springer Science+Business Media.

According to the Journal Citation Reports, the journal has a 2020 impact factor of 3.420. As of May 2022, the editor-in-chief is Timothy Taylor.
