= Tornow group =

Tornow group, also known as Tornow-Klenica and Tornow-Gostyn in Poland, in archaeology refers to the Middle Slavic pottery and related strongholds of "Tornow-type" which were present in the middle of Obra, Oder, Spree but also Elbe and Saale basins from Greater Poland up to Thuringia. It is a derivation of Prague-Korchak (and possibly Sukow-Dziedzice culture in Northeastern part), and dated since late 8th or early 9th century up to late 10th or early 11th century.

== Tornow-type pottery ==
It is generally named after Lower Lusatian village Tornow (district of Oberspreewald-Lausitz, Brandenburg), which doesn't exist anymore since mid-20th century and where were held extensive archaeological excavations in the 1960s. The early results have been politically used by Joachim Herrmann to make unsubstantiated claims about the migrations of the Early Slavs to East Germany and their level of cultural and societal complexity in comparison to Germanic peoples. Since 1980s the data was critically evaluated and old model rejected - they are not from 7th century early-Slavic but later middle-Slavic period with Carolingian influence. According to new chronologies, radiocarbon and dendrochronological dates, it appeared at least since the second half of the 9th century until late 10th century. M. Dulinicz also excluded it from Early Slavic pottery but wrongly dated it only since the end of 9th century. Barford considered since the first half of the 9th century with possible 8th century prototypes. Brzostowicz in 2002 since the late 8th century. Based on collected data, Lozny in 2013 dated it since late 8th or early 9th century. A minority of finds survived until the early 11th century.

The most know type of pottery with ripped decoration called Rippenschulterware. It had highest concentration in Brandenburg, but it was present from Greater Poland up to Elbe-Saale valley. As the valley mainly was an area of Leipzig group, Tornow-type was widespread on a much larger area than the supposedly related Sorbian-Lusatian tribes of Milzeni & Lusici, Dadosesani among others, thus rejecting simplified theses about links between individual tribes and material cultures. Individual finds were also found in Western Pomerania, Central Poland, and Podlachia in Eastern Poland. In some occasions, Feldberg and Menkendorf group pottery were also found in Tornow-type strongholds. Tornow pottery was technologically more advanced from both Feldberg and Menkendorf group, almost resembling Late Slavic tradition. It shares some features with Bohemian-Moravian pottery. Ceramological studies in 2011 and 2012 as well as archaeometric study in 2020 of Tornow-type pottery samples found "no differences in technology of this type of pottery, either in that found in the territory of Western Poland or that found in the territory of Eastern Germany", suggesting both territories were culturally related.

== Tornow-type forts ==
The appearance of Tornow-type forts some date to late 9th and early 10th century, while others "in the late 700s/early 800s and existed until late 800/early 900s". Their highest concentration was in Brandenburg, Schleswig-Holstein, Wendland, also in Pomerania and Greater Poland, but not Mecklenburg. There are several possible reasons for their building. It is argued to have been seats of local tribal chiefs, and possibly indicate a turbulent period of events when on the territory of Lusatian lands clashed German, Moravian-Bohemian, and Polish military forces in the 10th century. According to Ludomir R. Lozny, the dynamic Slavic social and political events and the Carolingian Empire expansion in North Central European Plains (NCEP) possibly resulted with the wide "Tornow Interaction Sphere" (TIS) of specific forts, villages and mixture of pottery types, but not a "state-level polity". The military construction of forts and found weaponry could also indicate a need of a "buffer zone between the Empire and the Norsemen". TIS fall was soon followed by unification process in Greater Poland leading to the formation of the Duchy of Poland (c. 960–1025).
