= Erik-Jan Zürcher =

Dutch professor of Turkish studies (born 1953)

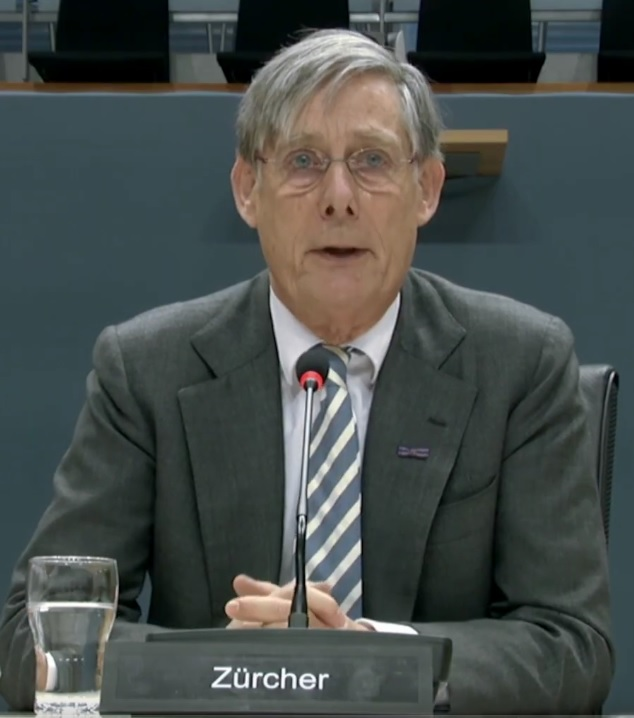
Erik-Jan Zürcher

Erik-Jan Zürcher (born 1953) is a Dutch Turkologist. He is a professor of Turkish studies at Leiden University since 1997. From 2008 to 2012 he served as director of the International Institute of Social History. His book Turkey: a Modern History is considered a standard work. Zürcher frequently comments on current issues related to Turkey.

== Career ==
Zürcher was born in 1953, the only child of Sinologist Erik Zürcher (1928–2008). Zürcher obtained a BA in Turkish studies from Leiden University in 1974. Three years later he received his MA in Turkish studies, with minors in both modern history and Persian. In 1984 he obtained his PhD in Turkish studies, also from Leiden University.

From 1977 to 1989 Zürcher was an assistant professor of Turkish and Persian at the Radboud University Nijmegen. He subsequently was employed as associate professor of modern history at the same university until 1997. From 1990 to 1999 he was a senior researcher at the International Institute of Social History. Between 1993 and 1997 Zürcher was an affiliate professor of social history of the Middle East at the University of Amsterdam. In that latter year he was appointed as full professor of Turkish studies at Leiden University.

Zürcher was director of the International Institute of Social History between April 2008 and November 2012.

== Honours and distinctions ==
In 2005, Zürcher received the Distinguished Service Award of the Ministry of Foreign Affairs of Turkey for his work in informing the Dutch political scene and general public on Turkey. The award was presented to him by foreign minister Abdullah Gül. In May 2016 he returned the award, citing "dictatorial misgovernment" by the government under Recep Tayyip Erdoğan.

Zürcher was elected a member of the Royal Netherlands Academy of Arts and Sciences in 2008.

== Views ==
A renowned specialist in Turkey's late modern history, "Zürcher’s research (...) has produced a critique of the official historiography of the Turkish Republic and Turkish nationalism, depicting the national resistance movement organised by Mustafa Kemal as a rupture with the past. By undermining the standard periodisation that clearly differentiates between the Ottoman era and the newly born Republic of Turkey, Zürcher demonstrated that the resistance movement was, to a large extent, started and organised by former Unionists, who were the key actors in the 1908 Constitutional Revolution and also responsible for the choices made on behalf of the Empire during World War I. According to Zürcher, although the Unionist leaders, especially Talat, Enver, and Cemal pashas, had fled the country immediately after the Armistice in November 1918, the cadres in the country and the leaders from abroad were a critical part of the national resistance movement. This argument in turn supported the so-called continuity thesis between the late Ottoman Empire and the early Turkish Republic, which underscores the many political, economic, and cultural elements that continued to exist from one state formation to another."

Zürcher has noted a tendency in Turkish government circles to refer nostalgically to the Ottoman Empire. According to him, this is in line with Recep Tayyip Erdoğan's depicting of a powerful Turkey in the future, linked to a glorious empire in the past.

Zürcher previously pleaded for accession of Turkey to the European Union. In 2012, he noted that the perspective of accession was lost politically in both Turkey and the European Union. In 2016, he noted that his previously expected advancement in democratic standards and Rechtsstaat did not materialize, and that Turkey therefore cannot and should not become a member of the European Union.

Reacting shortly after the 2016 Turkish coup d'état attempt, Zürcher stated that he deemed it "highly unlikely" that the Gülen movement was behind it. He added that the coup attempt would lead to Turkish president Erdoğan using the event to get rid of opponents, citing the example of arrest warrants for nearly 3000 judges.

== Works ==
- The Unionist Factor. The Role of the Committee of Union and Progress in the Turkish National Movement (1905–1926), Leiden: Brill, 1984
- Political Opposition in the Early Turkish Republic. The Progressive Republican Party (1924–1925), Leiden: Brill, 1991
- Turkey: a Modern History, London: I.B. Tauris, 1993
- The Young Turk Legacy and Nation Building, London: I.B. Tauris, 2010
