= Kobylany, Podkarpackie Voivodeship =

Kobylany
- Village
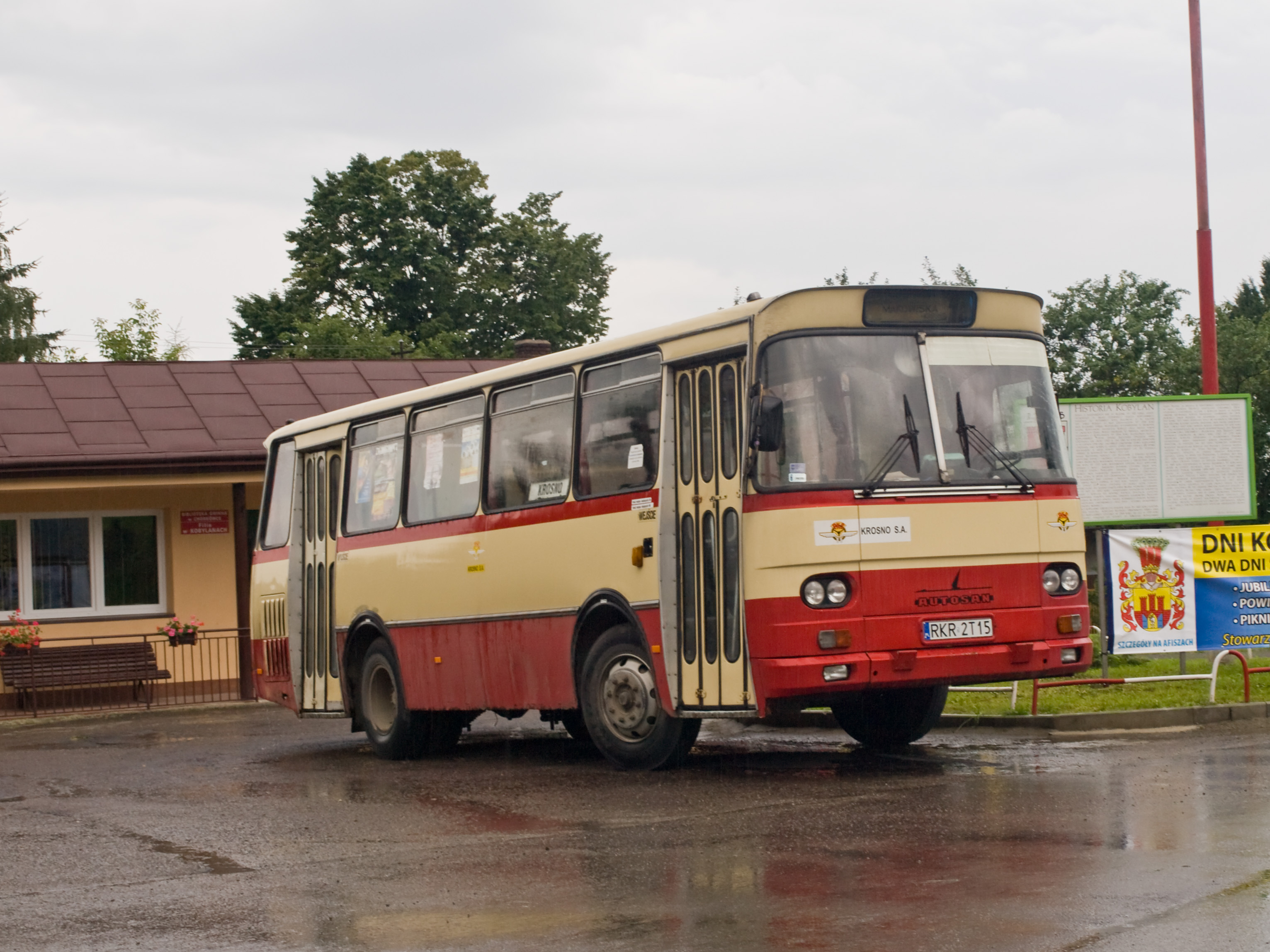
- A PKS Autosan H9-35 in the village

- Location within Poland
- Coordinates: 49°36′34″N 21°38′47″E
- Country: Poland
- Voivodeship: Subcarpathian
- County: Krosno
- Gmina: Chorkówka
- Elevation: 356 m (1,168 ft)
- Population: 1,100
- SIMC: 0347070
- Website: kobylany.prv.pl

Kobylany [kɔbɨˈlanɨ] is a village in the administrative district of Gmina Chorkówka, within Krosno County, Subcarpathian Voivodeship, in south-eastern Poland.
