= Erik Zürcher =

Dutch academic and sinologist (1928–2008)

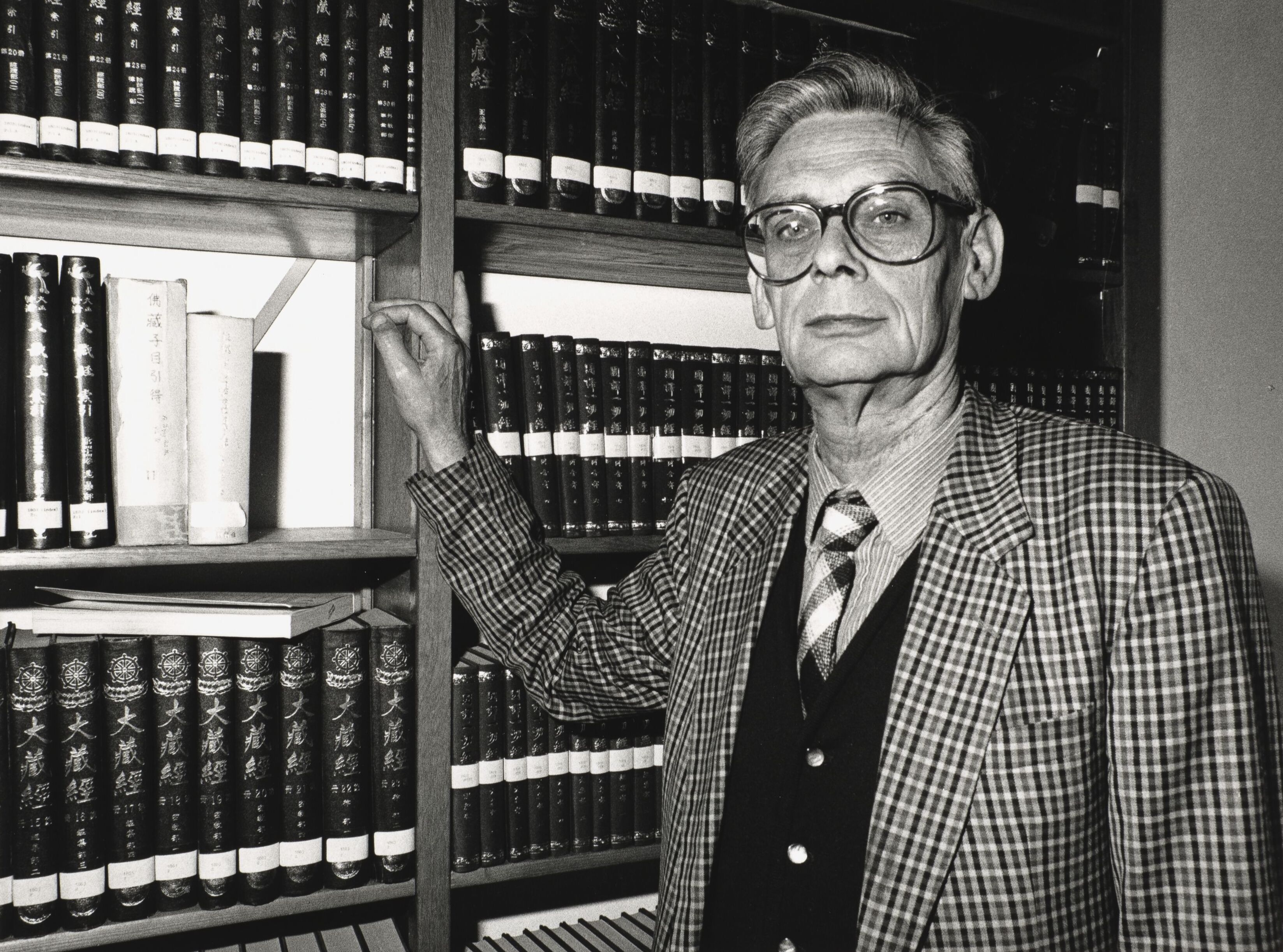
Zürcher (1991)

Erik Zürcher (13 September 1928, in Utrecht – 7 February 2008, in Warmond) was a Dutch Sinologist. From 1962 to 1993, Zürcher was a professor of history of East Asia at Leiden University. He was also Director of the Sinological Institute, between 1975 and 1990. His Chinese name was Xǔ Lǐhe (许理和).

== Biography ==
He studied Sinology, Buddhism, specializing in Chinese religions. In 1959, his PhD was over The Buddhist Conquest of China. In 1962 he became professor of history of East Asia, with particular focus on Chinese Buddhism, Chinese reactions to Christianity and early relations between China and the outside world.

He was a member of the Royal Netherlands Academy of Arts and Sciences since 1975 and an Associate of the Academie des Belles Lettres et des Incriptions of the Institut de France. He was also awarded the Medal of Honor for Art and Science in the Order of the House of Orange and made a Knight of the Order of the Netherlands Lion.

His son Erik-Jan Zürcher (born 1953) is a professor of Turkish languages and cultures at the University of Leiden and former director of the International Institute of Social History.

== Bibliography ==
- (2007), Kouduo richao. Li Jiubiao's Diary of oral admonitions. A Late Ming Christian journal, translated, with introduction and notes by Erik Zürcher, Sankt Augustin (Institut Monumenta Serica Brescia), 2 volumes, ISBN 978-3-8050-0543-2 (Monumenta Serica monograph series, 56/1- 2).
- (2007), The Buddhist Conquest of China. The Spread and Adaptation of Buddhism in Early Medieval China, Leiden (Brill), ISBN 978-90-04-15604-3 (Leidensia Sinica, vol. 11).

Adapted from his thesis. Original edition 1959.
Includes bibliography of E. Zürcher.

- (2002), (in Dutch), Traditionele bouwkunst in Taiwan (Traditional Architecture in Taiwan), (Dutch adaptation from the Chinese), Antwerp-Apeldoorn (Garant), ISBN 90-5350-202-5.
- (1996), Herrmann, Joachim and Erik Zürcher (eds.), History of Humanity. Scientific and Cultural Development, Vol. III: From the Seventh Century BC to the Seventh Century AD, London (Routledge), ISBN 0-415-09307-4 (Routledge reference). UNESCO.
- (1995), Chun-Chieh Huang and Erik Zürcher (eds.), Time and Space in Chinese culture, Leiden (Brill) ISBN 90-04-10287-6, (Leidensia Sinica, vol. 33).
- (1993), Confucianism for development?, Leiden (Leiden University Rĳks).

Valedictory Lecture Leiden.

- (1993) Chun-Chieh Huang and Erik Zürcher (eds.), Norms and the State in China, Leiden (Brill) ISBN 90-04-09665-5, (Leidensia Sinica, vol. 28). (Papers presented at a conference held 8–12 July 1991 at the Sinological Institute of Leiden University).
- (1991) Zürcher, Erik, Nicolas Standaert and Adrian Dudink (eds.), Bibliography of the Jesuit Mission in China (ca. 1580-ca. 1680), Leiden (Centre of Non-Western Studies), ISBN 90-73782-05-8, (CNWS publications, No. 5).
- (1990), Zürcher, E. and T. Langendorff (eds.), The Humanities in the Nineties. A View from the Netherlands, Amsterdam (Swets & Zeitlinger), ISBN 90-265-1133-7.
- (1990), (in French), Bouddhisme, Christianisme et société chinoise, Paris (Julliard), ISBN 2-260-00683-3.
- (1978), (in Dutch), Het leven van de Boeddha, (The Life of the Buddha), (translated from the earliest Chinese tradition and introduced by E. Zurcher), Amsterdam (Meulenhoff), ISBN 90-290-0608-0, (The Oriental Library, 10)

Translation of Xiuxing benqi jing and Zhong benqi jing.

- (1964), (in Dutch), Vos, F. and E. Zürcher, Spel zonder snaren. Enige beschouwingen over Zen, (Play without Strings. Some Reflections on Zen), Deventer (Kluwer).
- (1962), (in Dutch), Dialoog der misverstanden, (Dialogue of Misunderstandings), Leiden (Brill)

Address delivered in acceptance of the post of professor in the History of the Far East at the University of Leiden on 2 March 1962.

- (1959), The Buddhist Conquest of China. The Spread and Adaptation of Buddhism in Early Medieval China, Leiden (Brill), 2 volumes, vol. 1: Text, vol. 2: Notes, bibliography, indexes (Leidensia Sinica, vol. 11).Promise Leiden.

- (1976), (in Dutch), Syllabus "Boeddhisme", (Syllabus "Buddhism"), Leiden (Sinological Institute).
- (1974), (in Dutch), Aardrĳkskundig overzicht van China, (Geographical overview of China), Leiden (Sinological Institute).
- (1971), (in Dutch), Chronologie van de Culturele Revolutie, (Chronology of the Cultural Revolution), Leiden (Documentation for the current China, Sinological Institute).
- (1970), (in Dutch), Inleiding traditionele Chinese staat en maatschappĳ, (Introduction Traditional Chinese State and Society), Leiden (Documentation for the current China, Sinological Institute).
- (1970), (in Dutch), Geschiedenis van het Chinese communisme. Overzicht en chronologie, (History of Chinese Communism. Overview and chronology), Leiden (Documentation for the current China, Sinological Institute).
- (1970), (in Dutch), Geschiedenis-overzicht van China, (History Overview of China), Leiden (Documentation for the current China, Sinological Institute).
- (1970), (in Dutch), De Chinese Volksrepubliek (1949- ). Kort chronologisch overzicht, (The Chinese People's Republic (1949 -). Short Chronological overview), Leiden (Documentation for the current China, Sinological Institute).

- Blussé, Leonard and Harriet T. Zurndorfer, Conflict and Accommodation in Early Modern East Asia. Essays in Honour of Erik Zürcher, Leiden (Brill) 1993, ISBN 90-04-09775-9, (Leidensia Sinica, vol. 29).
- Liang, J.C.P. and R.P.E. Sybesma (eds.), From classical fú to "three inches high". Studies on Chinese in honor of Erik Zürcher, Leuven-Apeldoorn (Garant) 1993, ISBN 90-5350-249-1.
- Lloyd Haft, Words from the West. Western Texts in Chinese Literary Context. Essays to Honor Erik Zürcher on His Sixty-Fifth Birthday, Leiden (Centre of Non-Western Studies) 1993, ISBN 90-73782-19-8, (CNWS publications, vol. 16).
