= Joachim Herrmann (archaeologist) =

German archaeologist (1932–2010)

- Born: 19 December 1932; Lübnitz, Bad Belzig, Germany
- Died: 25 February 2010 (aged 77); Berlin, Germany
- Occupations: Author, editor, academic

Academic background
- Education: Humboldt University of Berlin
- Doctoral advisor: Karl-Heinz Otto

Academic work
- Discipline: History and Prehistory
- Sub-discipline: Slavic archaeology
- Institutions: German Academy of Sciences at Berlin; Central Institute for Ancient History and Archaeology

Joachim Herrmann (19 December 1932 – 25 February 2010) was a German historian, archaeologist, scientist, and institutional director. He was a noted scholar in East Germany (GDR) who specialized in Slavic archaeology, but with ambivalent legacy, as his career and research was politically motivated because of which he "deliberately distorted the view of history".

== Early life ==
In 1932, Herrmann was born in the village of Lübnitz in the district of Bad Belzig, Germany to a farming and milling family. He graduated from high school in Belzig. From 1951 to 1955, he studied history and prehistory at the Humboldt University of Berlin. He presented his doctoral dissertation in 1958 on the subject of the prehistoric and protohistoric fortifications of Greater Berlin and the district of Potsdam. His advisor was Karl-Heinz Otto.

== Career ==
In 1956, Herrmann became a research assistant at the Institute for Prehistory and Early History of the German Academy of Sciences at Berlin (DAW). He was promoted to senior research assistant in 1960. In 1964, he became a scientific work manager. Herrmann's habilitation or residency took place in December 1965, resulting in a thesis about archaeological excavations relating to "Slavic archaeology". In 1969, Herrmann became a professor at DAW. In 1971, he was awarded the National Prize of the German Democratic Republic (II. Class).

Later, he was appointed head director of the newly created Central Institute for Ancient History and Archaeology (ZIAGA) at the renamed Academy of Sciences of the GDR (AdW). He was selected for this position over his mentor Karl-Heinz Otto because of his vision for a centralized academic institution. Herrmann held the position until the reunification of Germany in 1990.

After the reunification of Germany, the East German academic institutions where Herrmann worked were restructured or closed. His work, status, and authority as a scholar was publicly criticized, making it difficult for him to continue any academic career. After his retirement in 1992, his national and international reputation declined. He became the secretary for the social sciences and humanities class of the Leibniz Association from 1993 to 2008. In 2009, the Leibniz Association awarded the Daniel Ernst Jablonski Medal to Herrmann. A year later he died in Berlin of cancer.

== Professional affiliations ==
In 1970, Herrmann helped organize the second International Congresses for Slavic Archaeology by (UIAS). He was a member of the Bulgarian Academy of Sciences, the German Academy of Sciences at Berlin (AdW), the German Archaeological Institute, the Polish Academy of Sciences, and the Ukrainian Academy of Sciences. He was also an honorary member of the Polish Archaeological Society and a member of the presidium of the Historians' Society of the GDR.

In 1985 he became a member of the International Committee of Historical Sciences (CISH). After his five-year re-election in September 1990, he was the only German representative, causing a protest from West German archaeologists. From 1986 to 1990, Herrmann was president of Urania.

== Awards ==
- 1971 – National Prize of the German Democratic Republic (II. Class)
- 1981 – Hero of Labour, German Democratic Republic
- 1990 – Honorary doctorate, University of Athens
- 2009 – Daniel Ernst Jablonski Medal, Leibniz Association

== Legacy ==
Herrmann remains an ambivalent figure in science. The so-called "Herrmann Era" from 1969 to 1990 was "characterized by the attempt to anchor the communist state ideology in research and teaching and by a more intense broad effect". At the time, his habilitation thesis (1965–68) was the only one of any caliber to "adequately implement Marxism".

The period 1989 through 1991 was a time of massive public criticism of Hermann's "historical propagandist activity". He obtained his position at the Central Institute for Ancient History and Archaeology (ZIAGA) because of his professional achievements and organizational skills, along with his support of the socialist system of East Germany and his membership in the Socialist Unity Party of Germany (SED) since 1954. Under his leadership, ZIAGA became the most important research institute in the GDR for classical studies. However, it was difficult for scientists to have a career under Herrmann if they were not members of the SED or were viewed suspiciously by the government. However, Herrmann on occasion placed long-term scientific research and projects above Marxist politics.

Although he was an editor and author, Herrmann was more of a desk scholar because of his administrative duties. The East German "Slavic archaeology" research of the history, culture, and contribution of Early Slavs in East-Central Europe, specifically within the East German borders, is inevitably linked to Herrmann. However, this research was also ideologically and politically motivated; based on Marxist archaeology, historical materialism, anti-Ostforschung, and pro-socialist bloc Pan-Slavism.

Herrmann was not academically critical when developing his theories on several ancient and early medieval distinct waves of West Slavic immigration into the East German territory, also arguing that they had almost the same cultural, societal and structural level of development as the Germanic peoples. He "deliberately distorted the view of history for political reasons...stubbornly holding on to the old interpretation even after the dendrochronological dating of the constructions became known".

Hermann's scholarly research is best summarized in a five-volume monograph on the excavations in the Slavic period settlement chamber at Ralswiek on Rügen Island.

== Bibliography ==
- Kultur und Kunst der Slawen in Deutschland von 7. bis 13. Jahrhundert. Institut für Vor- und Frühgeschichte Berlin 1965
- Tornow und Vorberg: Ein Beitrag zur Frühgeschichte der Lausitz. Akademie-Verlag, Berlin, 1966
- Siedlung, Wirtschaft und gesellschaftliche Verhältnisse der slawischen Stämme zwischen Oder/Neisse und Elbe: Studien auf der Grundlage archäologischen Materials. Akademie-Verlag, Berlin, 1968
- Zwischen Hradschin und Vineta: Frühe Kulturen der Westslawen. Urania, Leipzig-Jena-Berlin 1971
- Die germanischen und slawischen Siedlung und das mittelalterliche Dorf von Tornow, Kr. Calau. Akademie-Verlag, Berlin, 1973
- Spuren des Prometheus: Der Aufstieg der Menschheit zwischen Naturgeschichte und Weltgeschichte. Urania, Leipzig-Jena-Berlin 1975
- Wikinger und Slawen: Zur Frühgeschichte der Ostseevölker. Akademie-Verlag, Berlin 1982
- Editor: Die Slawen in Deutschland: Geschichte und Kultur der slawischen Stämme westlich von Oder und Neiße vom 6. bis 12. Jahrhundert. Akademie-Verlag, Berlin 1985
- Die Slawen in der Frühgeschichte des deutschen Volkes. Georg-Eckert-Institut für Internationale Schulbuchforschung, Braunschweig 1989.

== See also ==
- Leipzig group
- Tornow group
- Sukow-Dziedzice group
