= János Harmatta =

Hungarian linguist (1917 – 2004)

- Born: 2 October 1917; Hódmezővásárhely, Kingdom of Hungary
- Died: 24 July 2004 (aged 86); Budapest, Hungary

Academic work
- Discipline: Linguistics
- Sub-discipline: Indo-European linguistics

János Harmatta (2 October 1917 – 24 July 2004) was a Hungarian linguist. He deciphered the Parthian ostraca and papyri of Dura-Europos and was the first to decipher a major Bactrian inscription.

He taught as a professor at the Hungarian Academy of Sciences.

== Literary works ==
- Harmatta János (1917-): Forrástanulmányok Herodotos Skythika-jához = Quellenstudien zu den Skythika des Herodot / irta Harmatta János ()

== References and sources ==
Sources

- Harmatta János (1917-): Forrástanulmányok Herodotos Skythika-jához = Quellenstudien zu den Skythika des Herodot / irta Harmatta János
- Ferenczy Endre (1912-1990): Az ókori Róma története : [egyetemi tankönyv] / Ferenczy Endre, Maróti Egon, Hahn István; szerk. Harmatta János
- Szabó Miklós (1940-): Hellasz fénykora : Görögország az i.e. V. században / Szabó Miklós; [a szövegben szereplő prózai idézetek Devecseri Gábor et al. fordításai]
- Studies in the sources on the history of Pre-Islamic Central Asia / [by R. Ghirshman ... et al.]; ed. by J. Harmatta
- Prolegomena to the sources on the history of Pre-Islamic Central Asia / [by P. Aalto ... et al.]; ed. by J. Harmatta
