= Tadeusz Sulimirski =

Polish-born British historian and archaeologist

Tadeusz Józef Sulimirski
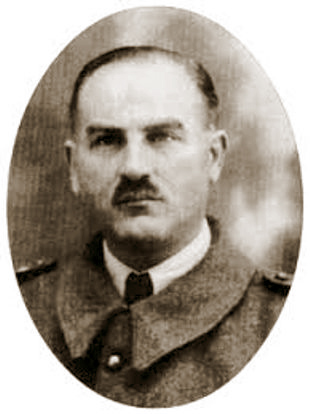
- Born: April 1, 1898; Kobylany, Austria-Hungary
- Died: June 20, 1983 (aged 85); London, United Kingdom
- Education: University of Lwów
- Known for: Pioneering research on the archaeology of Cimmerians, Scythians and Sarmatians
- Children: 5
- Scientific career
- Fields: Archaeology
- Workplaces: University of Lwów; Jagiellonian University; University of London

Tadeusz Józef Sulimirski (1 April 1898 – 20 June 1983) was a Polish-born British historian and archaeologist, who emigrated to the United Kingdom soon after the outbreak of World War II in 1939. Sulimirski was a pioneer and leading expert in the study of the archaeology of steppe nomads, particularly the Cimmerians, Scythians and Sarmatians.

== Early life ==
Tadeusz Joseph Sulimirski was born on 1 April 1898 in the town of Kobylany, which was then part of the Austria-Hungary. He belonged to Polish nobility, the szlachta. He received his primary education in Chyrów. From 1916 to 1920, Sulimirski served in the Polish Legions, fighting initially against the Russian Empire in World War I, and then against the Russian SFSR in the Polish-Soviet War.

After the peace, Sulimirski enrolled at the University of Lwów, acquiring a Doctor of Law in 1924. In 1929 he acquired a PhD in archaeology. He received a higher doctorate in 1931. Since 1931 he was Head of the Prehistory Department of the University of Lwów. Sulimirski became Chair of Prehistoric Archaeology at the Jagiellonian University in Kraków in 1936. In 1937 he was appointed Professor. While in this position, Sulimirski carried out pioneering archaeological research.

Upon the Invasion of Poland, Sulimirski rejoined the Polish Armed Forces. After the occupation of Poland by Nazi Germany and the Soviet Union, Sulimirski escaped to Romania, and from there he left for France. Upon the Fall of France soon afterwards, Sulimirski left for the United Kingdom, where he became Secretary-General to the Polish Government. In that position he wrote a number of geopolitical propaganda articles calling for the expansion of Poland to the west through the annexation of German territory lying east of the Oder River, on the grounds that in early medieval times those territories had been part of the early Polish state.

After recognition of the Polish government-in-exile was withdrawn by the Western governments, Sulimirski was a leading figure in the Committee for the Education of Poles in Great Britain. During this time, Sulimirski returned more and more to teaching. From 1952 he gave regular courses in East European prehistory at the London Institute of Archaeology of the University of London. In 1958 he was made Professor of Middle East and European Archaeology at the London University Institute of Archaeology. He also lectured at Cambridge University, University of Oxford, University of Glasgow, University of Edinburgh, University of Wrocław, and the University of Łódź. He gave lectures and seminars in many European countries in 1952-1965, and in a number of United States universities during a tour in 1968-1969. Sulimirski retired from the University of London in 1969, but continued to travel and lecture after retirement. He contributed immensely to the increasing the understanding of the archaeology of Eastern Europe in the West.

Cut off from carrying out archaeological research by his exile from Poland, Sulimirski dedicated his later career to writing. During World War II, almost all of his previous work was destroyed, but with the help from colleagues both in Poland and abroad, he was able to have his works rewritten and published in 1968. He was writer of more than 200 books, articles and other scientific publications. Of particular note is his work Prehistoric Russia (1970), and a series of articles published in the Bulletin of the Institute of Archaeology, where he made available in English the most recent research on the archaeology of Russia.

Sulimirski particularly specialized in the study of steppe nomads such as the Cimmerians, Scythians and Sarmatians. Much of this later writing was concerned with them. He was a pioneer and one of the world's foremost experts on the archaeology of the steppes. (Note: "Tadeusz Sulimirski, a giant of the archeology of the peoples of the steppes.")

Sulimirski was a Fellow of the Royal Anthropological Institute of Great Britain and Ireland and the Society of Antiquaries of London. In 1973 he was the recipient of the Jurzykowski Prize. He was very active in Polish organizations such as Polish University Abroad and the Polish Scientific Society.

Sulimirski died on 20 June 1983. He was survived by his wife, Olga Sulimirska; five children, Felicia Janiszewska (Boba), Maria Romanowska (Ninia), Witold Sulimirski, Karol (Charles) Sulimirski, Jerzy (George) Sulimirski; 15 grandchildren, including Witold's children, Ela (Landegger), Adam and Edward; and Karol's children, Roger, Mark and Renata (Weiss); and, numerous great grandchildren.

== Selected works ==
- Poland and Germany, Past and Future, 1942
- Corded Ware and Globular Amphorae North-East of the Carpathians, 1968
- The Sarmatians, 1970
- Prehistoric Russia: An Outline , 1970

== See also ==
- List of Poles

== Sources ==
- Chelkowski, Peter (2008). "Reviewed Work: Kimmerowie, Scytowie, Sarmaci: Księga poświęcona pamięci profesora Tadeusza Sulimirskiego [Cimmerians, Scythians, Sarmatians, In Memory of Professor Tadeusz Sulimirski] by Jan Chochorowski". The Polish Review. 53 (3). Polish Institute of Arts and Sciences of America: 374–376. JSTOR 25779756.
- "Dr Tadeusz Sulimirski". The Times. July 13, 1983. p. 12.
