= Francis R. B. Godolphin =

American classical scholar (1903–1974

Francis R. B. Godolphin (April 8, 1903 - December 29, 1974) was an American classicist and educator. He used the nickname "Frisco" with friends.

He was born in 1903 in Del Rio, Texas. He attended Princeton University, graduating with a bachelor's degree in 1924. He received an M.A. from New York University in 1926. He returned to Princeton for doctoral study and received his Ph.D. in 1929. His dissertation was titled "The Chronology of Greek Middle Comedy."

Godolphin was an instructor at New York University, the New Jersey College for Women, and Princeton. After completing his doctorate, he became part of the permanent Princeton faculty.

During the Second World War, Godolphin served in the United States Marine Corps in the Pacific Theater. He rose to the rank of captain.

Returning to Princeton in 1945, he was made dean of the College. He held that office until 1955. From 1946 until his retirement, he was Musgrave Professor of Latin.

Godolphin edited three volumes of the Modern Library: The Greek Historians (1942), The Latin Poets (1949), and Great Classical Myths (1964).

He retired from Princeton in 1970 and died in Tucson, Arizona in 1974.
