= Ilya Gershevitch =

Scholar, expert on Iran (1914-2001)

- Russian: Илья Аркадьевич Гершевич
- Born: October 24, 1914; Zürich
- Died: April 11, 2001 (aged 86); Cambridge
- Scientific career
- Thesis: A Grammar of Manichaean Sogdian (1943)
- Doctoral advisor: Walter Henning
- Notable students: Nicholas Sims-Williams

Ilya Gershevitch, FBA (24 October 1914 – 11 April 2001) was a noted Iranologist.

Gershevitch was born in Zürich to Russian parents Arkadi and Mila, who raised him in Smolensk, migrated to Germany and later fled from Germany to Switzerland at the outbreak of World War I.

Gershevitch enrolled in the University of Rome in 1933 and moved to England in 1938. In 1948, he became the first holder of a new Lectureship in Iranian Studies at Cambridge University. He became a Fellow of the British Academy in 1967 and later a corresponding member of the Accademia dei Lincei, the Royal Danish Academy of Sciences and Letters and the Russian Academy of Sciences. In 1971, he received an honorary doctorate from the University of Berne.

Gershevitch died in 2001 in Cambridge.

His work includes pioneering studies of the Bashkardi dialect, and the decipherment of Bactrian, besides contributions to Sogdian and Avestan philology, Ossetic, Elamite and Zoroastrian studies and Achaemenid history.
