= Timothy Taylor (archaeologist) =

British-based archaeologist

Timothy Taylor (born 10 July 1960) is a British archaeologist, academic, and author specializing in European prehistory and archaeological theory. He is Jan Eisner professor of Archaeology at Comenius University. Taylor previously held academic posts at University of Vienna and University of Bradford, where he served as Reader in Archaeology.

His research spans the later prehistory of Eurasia and thematic topics such as ritual behavior, death practices, cannibalism, sexuality in prehistory, and the development of archaeological theory. He has authored more than 160 scholarly publications, including several monographs translated into multiple languages.

== Early life and education ==
Born in Norwich, United Kingdom, Taylor studied archaeology and anthropology at the University of Cambridge, receiving a Bachelor of Arts (BAHons) from St John's College Cambridge in 1982 and an MA in 1985.

He subsequently undertook postgraduate research at the University of Oxford, studying at Christ Church Oxford, and later as a Randall-MacIver Student at The Queen's College Oxford.

Taylor completed a PhD in archaeology at the University of Bradford in 1995, focusing on Eastern European archaeology and on theoretical approaches to prehistoric societies.

During his early academic career he also spent time as a visiting student at Sofia University St. Kliment Ohridski in Bulgaria, contributing to collaborative research on Eastern European archaeology.

== Academic career ==
He began his research career as a Junior Research Fellow in Archaeology at King's College Cambridge from 1988 to 1990. He then worked as Assistant Editor of the journal Antiquity from 1990 to 1992. His academic work began studying ornamental metalwork of the Balkans and western Asia.

Since, his focus has shifted and he has done extensive work on the archaeology of cannibalism, sexuality and material culture theory. He has also written several popular books on archaeology. In the 1980s and 1990s he frequently presented his work on television. The British Archaeological Award winner for "best popular archaeology on television" 1991 was a "Down to Earth" episode on which he appeared.

From 1990 to 2004, Taylor served as Lecturer in Archaeology at the University of Bradford, where he later became Reader in Archaeology (2004–2012).

He subsequently joined the University of Vienna, where he served as Professor of the Prehistory of Humanity (2012–2020) in the Department of Prehistoric and Historical Archaeology. During this period he was also Director of the Vienna Institute of Archaeological Science from 2013 to 2020. He continues to serve on the executive board of the Austrian Society for Pre- and Protohistory.

In 2020, Taylor was appointed Jan Eisner Professor of Archaeology at Comenius University in Bratislava, where he continues to teach and conduct research in archaeological theory and European prehistory. He is a Fellow of the Society of Antiquaries of London (FSA), and of the Royal Society of Arts (FRSA).

Taylor has participated in a range of academic and advisory bodies, including the Theoretical Archaeology Group (TAG) in the United Kingdom. He organized the 1994 TAG conference at the University of Bradford.

Taylor has been a long-standing member of the intellectual network Edge Foundation, participating in public discussions on science, culture, and philosophy.

He has also contributed to interdisciplinary initiatives such as the “Invisible Dead” project funded by the John Templeton Foundation, which explored cultural responses to death.

== Research and scholarship ==
Taylor’s research focuses on later prehistoric Europe and Eurasia, with particular attention to the cultural and symbolic dimensions of prehistoric societies. His work addresses themes such as ritual behavior, cannibalism, vampirism, mortuary practices, social hierarchy, and aesthetic expression in prehistoric contexts.

He has also contributed to the development of archaeological theory, teaching the subject for more than three decades at universities including Bradford, Vienna, and Comenius University.

Taylor has been involved in field projects, including research on prehistoric lake-shore settlements and environmental change in Central Europe. He served as principal investigator of the “Beyond Lake Villages” (BeLaVi) project, a multinational study examining Neolithic environmental changes and human settlement patterns around small lakes in Switzerland, Germany, and Austria.

His work frequently employs multi-proxy landscape reconstruction, combining archaeological, environmental, and geophysical data to reconstruct prehistoric environments.

Taylor served as Editor-in-Chief of the Journal of World Prehistory from 2008 to 2025, overseeing the publication during a period in which it became one of the leading journals in prehistoric studies.

He has also served on editorial boards of several academic publications and has acted as reviewer for major international presses including Oxford University Press, Cambridge University Press, and Yale University Press.He is the author of several influential monographs, including The Prehistory of Sex: Four Million years of Human Sexual Culture (1996), The Buried Soul: How Humans Invented Death (2002), and The Artificial Ape: How Technology Changed the Course of Human Evolution (2010).

In The Artificial Ape, Taylor explores the role of technology in shaping human evolution. He argues that the early hominin practice of shaping stone tools around 2.6 million years ago initiated a process in which technology fundamentally influenced human development, including social structures, reproductive strategies, and cognitive capacities. He emphasizes that technological innovations allowed humans to externalize memory, extend cognitive abilities, and create tools that enabled larger brain development.

Taylor also discusses the long-term consequences of technological dependence, suggesting that while technology has enhanced human capabilities, it has also begun to reduce certain biological faculties, such as innate memory and physical skills, which were once essential for survival.

== Books ==
- Taylor, Timothy (1996). The Prehistory of Sex: Four Million Years of Human Sexual Culture. Fourth Estate. ISBN 978-1-85702-352-7.
- Taylor, Timothy (2002). The Buried Soul: How Humans Invented Death. Fourth Estate. ISBN 978-1-85702-696-2.
- Taylor, Timothy (20 July 2010). The Artificial Ape: How Technology Changed the Course of Human Evolution. Macmillan + ORM. ISBN 978-0-230-10973-5.
- Taylor, Timothy (2003), "Gundestrup Cauldron", Oxford Art Online, Oxford University Press
- Taylor, Timothy (2001). "Thracians, Scythians, and Dacians, 800 BC–AD 300.". In Cunliffe, Barry (ed.). The Oxford Illustrated History of Prehistoric Europe. Oxford University Press. ISBN 978-0-19-285441-4.
- Taylor, Timothy (1 June 2001). "Believing the ancients: quantitative and qualitative dimensions of slavery and the slave trade in later prehistoric Eurasia". World Archaeology. 33 (1): 27–43. doi:10.1080/00438240126644. ISSN 0043-8243.
- Taylor, Timothy (2005). "Ambushed by a Grotesque: Archaeology, Slavery and the Third Paradigm.". In Parker Pearson, Mike; Thorpe, I.J.N. (eds.). Warfare, Violence and Slavery in Prehistory: Proceedings of a Prehistoric Society conference at Sheffield University. Ann Arbor, MI: University of Michigan Press. ISBN 978-1-84171-816-3.
- Wilson, Andrew S.; Taylor, Timothy; Ceruti, Maria Constanza; Chavez, Jose Antonio; Reinhard, Johan; Grimes, Vaughan; Meier-Augenstein, Wolfram; Cartmell, Larry; Stern, Ben; Richards, Michael P.; Worobey, Michael; Barnes, Ian; Gilbert, M. Thomas P. (16 October 2007). "Stable isotope and DNA evidence for ritual sequences in Inca child sacrifice". Proceedings of the National Academy of Sciences. 104 (42): 16456–16461. doi:10.1073/pnas.0704276104. ISSN 0027-8424. PMC 2034262. PMID 17923675.
- Taylor, Timothy (2021). "The arrogation of slavery: prehistory, archaeology, and pre-theoretical commitments concerning people as property". In Biermann, Felix; Jankowiak, Marek (eds.). The Archaeology of Slavery in Early Medieval Northern Europe: The Invisible Commodity. Themes in Contemporary Archaeology. Cham: Springer International Publishing. doi:10.1007/978-3-030-73291-2. ISBN 978-3-030-73290-5.
- Taylor, Timothy (24 December 2025). "The World Without Prehistory". Journal of World Prehistory. 38 (2): 17. doi:10.1007/s10963-025-09204-5. ISSN 1573-7802.
