= Enaree =

Ancient Scythian religious figure

The Enarei, singular Enaree, were Scythian priestesses and shamanistic soothsayers who played an important role in the Scythian religion. The Enarei were assigned male at birth but considered to have undergone a divine/religious transformation of their sex, after which they assumed feminine roles and lived as women. They served the Snake-Legged Goddess and the goddess Artimpasa.

== Name ==
The English name Enaree is derived from the Ancient Greek name recorded by Herodotus of Halicarnassus as Enarees (Ἐνάρεες), itself derived from the Scythian term Anarya, meaning "unmanly." The term anarya is composed of the elements a-, meaning "non-," and narya, which was derived from nar-, meaning "man." The name Anarya was more accurately represented in Ancient Greek by Pseudo-Hippocrates as Anarieis (Ἀναριεῖς).

The Enarei were Scythian, yet most of these names were recorded by Greek writers and thus may not reflect the names that the Enarei or their society used to describe themselves. Importantly, many of these Greek writers disapproved of the Enarei and blamed them for sacking the temple of Aphrodite Ourania at Ascalon, describing their origins negatively. Their original names have not been recorded.

== Religious role ==
The Enarei were affiliated with an orgiastic cult of two closely related goddesses: Artimpasa and the Scythians' ancestral Snake-Legged Goddess. The forms of the goddesses the Enarei served were strongly influenced by Near Eastern fertility goddesses. Thus the rites of the Enarei combined indigenous Scythian religious practices of a shamanistic nature, which were themselves related to those of indigenous Siberian peoples, as well as ones imported from Levantine religions.

=== Rituals ===
Some modern scholars believe the Enarei served largely similar purposes in the cult of Artimpasa as priests of other genders. There is limited written evidence, but a wider body of archaeological evidence, that depicts the Enarei's roles in rituals and the more general role of the cult.

One ornamental panel from the 3rd or 4th century B.C. shows an Enarei priest serving wine for a holy communion alongside the chief priestess of the goddess.

The Enarei likely also led Scythian funeral rituals. After the mummification and burial of the deceased, involved priests ritually cleansed themselves with the vapour of cannabis, in a shamanic ritual. Herodotus described this as a tent-based cleansing that would cause the priests to howl with laughter. Funerary practices are also attested archaeologically in Saka tombs from Siberia, which contained tripods, braziers, pelts, and charcoal containing remains of cannabis leaves and fruits. A pot from one of the Pazyryk burials contained cannabis fruits, as well as a copper censer used to burn cannabis. Although this documentary and archaeological evidence does not explicitly link Enarei to these rituals, it confirms the involvement of at least some priests in the cult of Artimpasa.

Cannabis was likely used for both communal and funerary or psychopompic rituals, making these priests among the earliest spiritual practitioners to have used cannabis to achieve altered states of consciousness.

=== Divination ===
The Enarei also acted as seers, performing a unique role in the cult. They practiced a particular form of divination which used the inner bark of the linden tree, unlike the methods of traditional Scythian soothsayers which used willow withies. The Enarei divined by cutting the inner linden bark into three pieces, and plaiting and unplaiting these pieces around their fingers to obtain answers. For Scythians in Russia, linden then became a symbol for the third gender, or for people who are feminine-presenting and born male.

The Enarei were especially consulted when the king of the Scythians was ill, which was itself believed by the Scythians to be caused by a false oath being sworn upon the king's hearth. Once the Enarei had identified the suspect who had sworn the false oath, the said suspect would claim to be innocent. If the Enarei maintained the accusation, six more soothsayers were consulted, and if they upheld the original accusation, the suspect was executed by being beheaded. If the additional soothsayers declared the suspect was innocent, the process of consulting more soothsayers was repeated.

If the soothsayers all found the accused to be guilty, the culprit was executed through beheading, and his property was divided among the Enarei who had found him guilty.

However, if the larger number of soothsayers still declared the suspect to be innocent, the initial accusers were executed. The accusing soothsayers were put into an oxen-pulled wagon filled with brushwood which was set on fire. The wagon was then pulled by the oxen, who eventually also burned along with the wagon and the disgraced soothsayers. The sons of these Enarei were also all killed, but their daughters were spared.

=== Regalia ===
The Enarei may have worn additional regalia such as drums used in shamanic rituals and antlered headdresses similar to those found in Saka horse burials and those worn in more recent times by Siberian shamans.

The Enarei used sceptres capped with ornate pole tops, often including rattles, as symbols of authority. These have been discovered throughout the steppe from Mongolia to the Great Hungarian Plain. The oldest of these date from the 8th century BC, from Tuva and the Minusinsk Basin, and are topped by a stag or ibex standing with its feet together as if perched on a rocky eminence. More recent pole tops are more elaborate in design, such as one found in the Oleksandropilskiy kurhan, which is in the shape of a goddess with her hands on her hips. Another one from the same kurgan takes the shape of a griffin in a frame from which two bells hang, and a third from that same kurgan splits into three branches, each topped by a bird of prey holding a bell in its beak. The rattling and tinkling of the sceptres' bells invited the audience to the impending rites.

== Sex ==
Pseudo-Hippocrates wrote that they wore women's clothing, performed women's jobs alongside other women, and acted like other women. The Enarei spoke with a feminine voice and used grammar assigned to women, likely employing words and phrases specific to women as well. Scythians viewed the Enarei as essentially different than most men due to divine transformation. Modern scholars such as Walter Penrose have interpreted the Enarees as transgender, intersex, or non-binary individuals. Tomasz Gralak takes the Enarei as evidence that the Scythians did not see gender in binary terms, and argues that the gender transformation of the Enarei were made surgically and pharmacologically. The use of premarin for pharmacological transition has been questioned on the basis that the sourcing for the claim is poor and that it is unlikely to be medically feasible.

The Enarei were respected by their communities and belonged to the most powerful level of the Scythian aristocracy. The Scythians believed the Enarei were repeatedly born into certain families, and this was often ascribed to a goddess's hereditary curse upon warriors who had sacked her temple.

=== Central Asian origins ===
According to indigenous Scythian shamanic traditions, the Enarei were considered "transformed" shamans who had changed their sex. This implied they were the most powerful of shamans, inspiring fear and special respect in Scythian society. The traditions of "gender-crossing shamanism," whereby men obtain the power of prophecy and of becoming religious figures possessed by spirits by abandoning their masculinity, have been preserved until recent times by indigenous Siberians.

=== West Asian influences ===
During the 7th century BC, the Scythians expanded into West Asia, during which time the Scythian religion was influenced by the religions of the peoples of the Fertile Crescent. The Scythians believed that the androgyny of the Enarei originated during this period from a curse by the goddess Artimpasa to the perpetrators of the sack of the temple in Ascalon of the goddess Astarte. She was an androgynous vegetation-fertility goddess who was believed to have the ability to change men into women and women into men, and whom the Scythians identified with their own goddess, Artimpasa. This curse was believed to be inherited by the descendants of the perpetrators of the sack. The androgyny of the Enarei was thus also typical of the cult of the Levantine celestial ʿAštart.

For the Scythians, the Enarei combined the traits of both the "transformed" shaman of the steppe peoples and the gender non-conforming priests of the West Asian Great Goddess, such as the Kelabim of ʿAštart, the Galli of Kubeleya, and the Megabyzoi or Megabyxoi of Ephesian Artemis.

Greek writers recorded the curse origin story as resulting from the sack of the temple of Aphrodite Ourania, because they equated her with Astarte. Other Greek historians created further origin stories for the Enarei. The Greek Pseudo-Hippocrates later ascribed the androgyny of the Enarei to impotency caused by the Scythians' practise of riding horses and wearing trousers. The Greek Clement of Alexandria explained the Enarei's androgyny as a disease of feminization spread by the androgynous Scythian philosopher Anacharsis.

=== Heredity and age ===
The Scythians believed the Enarei were repeatedly born into the same family lines. Given the hereditary nature of the Enarei and the descriptions of Astarte's curse, the Enarei appear to have lived their early lives as men, with their gender-altering transformation happening later in their lives.

== Archaeology ==
Some archaeological finds have been connected to the Enarei, including Scythian burials at the Aymyrlyg cemetery in Siberia. Eileen M. Murphy refers to burials found with slipped capital femoral epiphysis (a condition associated with delayed sexual development in males), as well as individuals with chromosomal abnormalities, as potentially being the "effeminate males" Herodotus described. Jeannine Davis-Kimball connects a high-status burial at Tillya Tepe in Afghanistan to the Enarei. The individual was male and dressed in clothing very similar to that of neighboring priestess burials, and was accompanied by artifacts unusual for male burials.

== See also ==
- Gala (priests)
- Galli
- Hijra

== Sources ==
- Ascherson, Neal (1995). Black Sea. New York City, United States: Hill & Wang. ISBN 978-0-224-04102-7.
- Conner, Randy P. (1997). "Enaree". Cassell's Encyclopedia of Queer Myth, Symbol, and Spirit: Gay, Lesbian, Bisexual, and Transgender Lore. London, United Kingdom: Cassell. pp. 129–131, 215. ISBN 978-0-304-33760-6.
- Cunliffe, Barry (2019). The Scythians: Nomad Warriors of the Steppe. Oxford, United Kingdom; New York City, United States: Oxford University Press. ISBN 978-0-198-82012-3.
- Davis-Kimball, J. (2000). "Enarees and Women of High Status: Evidence of Ritual at Tillya Tepe (Northern Afghanistan)". In J. Davis-Kimball; E. M. Murphy; L. Koryakova; L. T. Yablonsky (eds.). Kurgans, Ritual Sites, and Settlements: Eurasian Bronze and Iron Age. Archaeopress. pp. 223–39. ISBN 9781841710907.
- Ivantchik, Askold (2018). "Scythians". Encyclopædia Iranica. New York City, United States: Encyclopædia Iranica Foundation; Brill Publishers.
- Ivantchik, Askold I. (2016). "L'idéologie royale des Scythes et son expression dans la littérature et l'iconographie grecques : l'apport de la numismatique" [The Royal Ideology of the Scythians and its Expression in Greek Literature and Iconography: the Contribution of Numismatics]. Dialogues d'histoire ancienne [Dialogues of Ancient History]. 42 (1): 305–329.
- Murphy, E. (2004). "Herodotus and the Amazons Meet the Cyclops: Philology, Osteoarchaeology, and the Eurasian Iron Age". In E. W. Sauer (ed.). Archaeology and Ancient History: Breaking Down the Boundaries. Routledge. pp. 169–84. ISBN 9780203643716.
- Parzinger, Hermann (2004). Die Skythen [The Scythians] (in German). Munich, Germany: Verlag C.H.Beck. ISBN 978-3-406-50842-4.
- Penrose, Jr., Walter D. (2020-02-03). "Gender Diversity in Classical Greek Thought". In Surtees, Allison (ed.). Exploring Gender Diversity in the Ancient World. Edinburgh University Press. p. 38. ISBN 978-1-4744-4706-5.
- Phillips, E. D. (1972). "The Scythian Domination in Western Asia: Its Record in History, Scripture and Archaeology". World Archaeology. 4 (2): 129–138. doi:10.1080/00438243.1972.9979527. JSTOR 123971.
- Ustinova, Yulia (1999). The Supreme Gods of the Bosporan Kingdom: Celestial Aphrodite and the Most High God. Leiden, Netherlands; Boston, United States: Brill Publishers. ISBN 978-9-004-11231-5.
- Ustinova, Yulia (2005). "Snake-Limbed and Tendril-Limbed Goddesses in the Art and Mythology of the Mediterranean and the Black Sea". Scythians and Greeks: Cultural Interaction in Scythia, Athens and the Early Roman Empire (sixth Century BC - First Century AD). Exeter, United Kingdom: University of Exeter Press. pp. 64–79. ISBN 978-0-859-89746-4.
