= Anacharsis =

Scythian philosopher

- Prince of Scythia
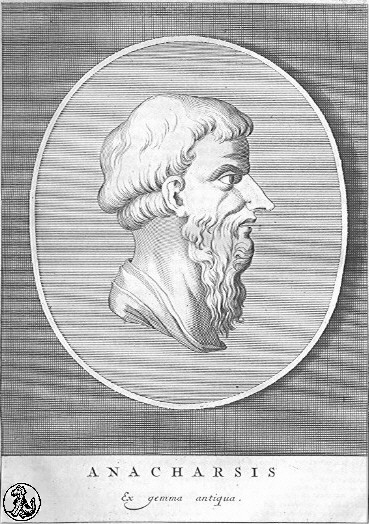
- 18th-century portrait, based on an ancient engraved gem.
- Born: Middle 6th century BC
- Died: Late 6th century BC
- Father: Gnurus
- Religion: Scythian religion
- Occupation: Philosopher

Anacharsis (/ˌænəˈkɑːrsɪs/; Ancient Greek: Ἀνάχαρσις, romanized: Anákharsis) was a Scythian prince and philosopher of uncertain historicity who lived in the 6th century BC.

== Life ==
Anacharsis was the brother of the Scythian king Saulius, and both of them were the sons of the previous Scythian king, Gnurus.

Few concrete details are known about the life of the historical Anacharsis. He is known to have travelled to Greece, where he possibly became influenced by Greek culture.

Anacharsis was later killed by his brother Saulius for having sacrificed to the Scythian ancestral Snake-Legged Goddess at her shrine in the country of Hylaea by performing an orgiastic and shamanistic ritual at night during which he wore images on his dress and played drums.

The ancient Greek author, Herodotus of Halicarnassus, claimed that Anacharsis had been killed because he had renounced Scythian customs and adopted Greek ones, although this claim was likely invented by Herodotus himself. The religious rituals practised by Anacharsis instead corresponded more closely to those of the transvestite Anarya priesthood of the Scythians.

=== Legacy ===
An amphora found in the western temenos at Pontic Olbia where was located the temple of Apollo Iētros (lit. 'Apollo the Healer') recorded the dedication of "paternal honey" to this god by a Scythian named Anaperrēs (Αναπερρης), who may have been the son of Anacharsis.

The nephew of Anacharsis, Idanthyrsus, who was the son and successor of Saulius, would later become famous among the Greeks in his own right for having resisted the Persian invasion of Scythia in 513 BC.

==== In Graeco-Roman philosophy ====
Later Graeco-Roman tradition transformed Anacharsis into a legendary figure as a kind of "noble savage" who represented "Barbarian wisdom," due to which the ancient Greeks included him as one of the Seven Sages of Greece. Consequently, Anacharsis became a popular figure in Greek literature, and many legends arose about him, including claims that he had been a friend of Solon.

The ancient Greek historian Ephorus of Cyme later used this image of Anacharsis to create an idealised image of the Scythians.

Eventually, Anacharsis completely became an ideal "man of nature" or "noble savage" figure in Greek literature, as well as favourite figure of the Cynics, who ascribed to him a 3rd-century BC work titled the Letters of Anacharsis. Lucian wrote two works on him, Anacharsis or Athletics (Ἀνάχαρσις ἢ Περὶ Γυμνασίων) and The Scythian (Σκύθης).

Due to the transformation of Anacharsis into a favourite character of Greek philosophers, nearly all of the ancient writings concerning him are about Greek literature, which makes the information regarding the historical Anacharsis himself difficult to assess.

Anacharsis is mentioned in The Apology by Tertullian of Carthage, a North African Montanist Christian apologist who cited his argument against anti-intellectualism. He is also mentioned in another of Tertullian’s works, On the Pallium. He is mentioned as an inventor in Plato's Republic.

== Sources ==
- Ivantchik, Askold I. (2016). "L'idéologie royale des Scythes et son expression dans la littérature et l'iconographie grecques : l'apport de la numismatique" [The Royal Ideology of the Scythians and its Expression in Greek Literature and Iconography: the Contribution of Numismatics]. Dialogues d'histoire ancienne [Dialogues of Ancient History] (in French). 42 (1): 305–329.
- Ivantchik, Askold (2018). "Scythians". Encyclopædia Iranica. New York City, United States: Encyclopædia Iranica Foundation; Brill Publishers.
- Rusyayeva, A. S. [in Ukrainian] (2007). "Religious Interactions between Olbia and Scythia". In Braund, David; Kryzhintskiy, S. D. [in Russian] (eds.). Classical Olbia and the Scythian World: From the Sixth Century BC to the Second Century AD. Oxford, United Kingdom: Oxford University Press. pp. 93–102. ISBN 978-0-197-26404-1.
- Rusyayeva, Anna S. [in Ukrainian] (2003). "The Main Development of the Western Temenos of Olbia in the Pontos" (PDF). In Bilde, Pia Guldager; Højte, Jakob Munk; Stolba, Vladimir F. (eds.). The cauldron of Ariantas: studies presented to A.N. Ščeglov on the occasion of his 70th birthday. Aarhus, Denmark: Aarhus University Press. pp. 93–116. ISBN 978-8-779-34923-0.
- Schubert, Charlotte (2010). Anacharsis der Weise. Nomade, Skythe, Grieche [Anacharsis the Wise. Nomad, Scythian, Greek]. Leipziger Studien zur Klassischen Philologie, volume 7. Tübingen: Narr, ISBN 978-3-8233-6607-2.
- Ustinova, Yulia (1999). The Supreme Gods of the Bosporan Kingdom: Celestial Aphrodite and the Most High God. Leiden, Netherlands; Boston, United States: Brill Publishers. ISBN 978-9-004-11231-5.
