= Artimpasa =

Ancient central Asian goddess

- Warfare, Sovereignty, Priestly force, Fecundity, Vegetation and Fertility
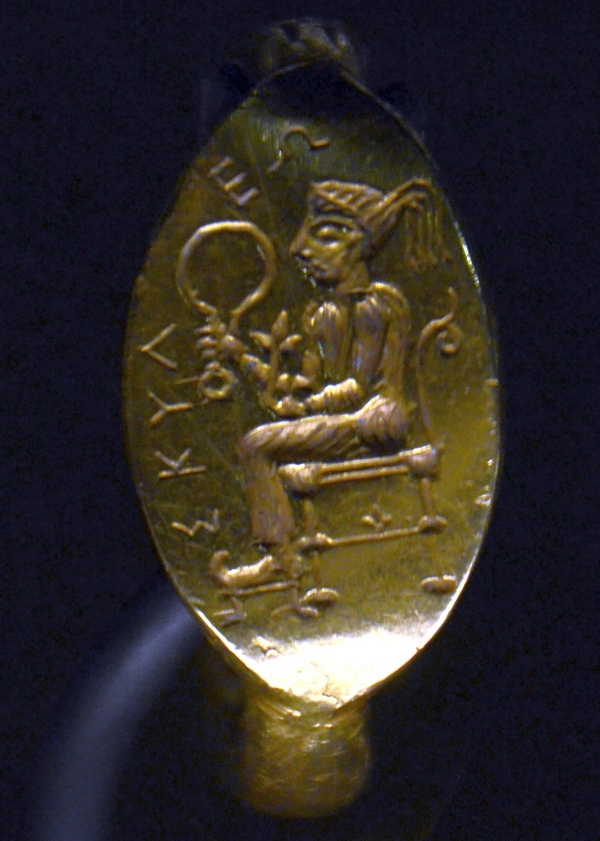
- The seated goddess Artimpasa on the bezel of the king Scyles
- Affiliation: The Snake-Legged Goddess
- Animals: Horses, panthers
- Gender: Female
- Region: Eurasian steppe
- Ethnic group: Scythic peoples
- Parents: Api and Papaios
- Consort: Targī̆tavah

Equivalents
- Canaanite: ʿAštart
- Greek: Aphroditē Ourania
- Mesopotamian: Ištar

Artimpasa (Ancient Greek: Αρτιμπασα, romanized: Artimpasa; Latin: Artimpasa) was a complex androgynous Scythian goddess of fertility who possessed power over sovereignty and the priestly force. Artimpasa was the Scythian variant of the Iranian goddess Arti/Aṣ̌i.

== Name ==
The first element of Artimpasa's name was derived from that of the Iranian Goddess 𐬀𐬭𐬙𐬌 (Arti), while the second element was related to the terms paya, meaning "pasture", and pati, meaning "lord", both derived from a common root.

Artimpasa is often erroneously called Argimpasa (Ancient Greek: Αργιμπασα, romanized: Argimpasa; Latin: Argimpasa) due to a scribal corruption.

== History ==
=== Origins ===
Artimpasa was the Scythian variant of the Iranian goddess Arti (𐬀𐬭𐬙𐬌)/Aṣ̌i (𐬀𐬴𐬌), who was a patron of fertility and marriage and a guardian of laws who represented material wealth in its various forms, including domestic animals, precious objects, and a plentiful descendance.

=== Thracian influences ===
There were outside influences on Artimpasa, such as from the Moon and Hunting goddess Bendis of the Thracian neighbours of the Scythians, who like Artimpasa was a mistress of animals and a power-giver. The presence of these similarities between Artimpasa and Bendis, however, suggests that these aspects of Artimpasa had an indigenously Scythian/Balkan element and were not fully results of the undermentioned influence of ancient West Asian cults.

=== Western Asian influences ===
The ancient West Asian cults who influenced Artimpasa were those of ʿAštart-Ištar-Aphroditē during the long-period of Scythian presence in Western Asia in the 7th century BCE, especially in the latter's form worshipped at Ascalon of an androgynous vegetation-fertility goddess who had the ability to change men into women and women into men.

Artimpasa henceforth preserved many traits inherited from ʿAštart, and, reflecting influence from Levantine cults in which the Great Goddess was often accompanied by a minor semi-bestial goddess, it was from the ʿAštart-Aphroditē of Ascalon, to whom was affiliated a semi-human goddess subordinate to her in the form of ʿAtarʿatah, that was derived the affiliation of the Snake-Legged Goddess, who was also the Scythian equivalent of the semi-human goddess subordinate to the Great Goddess as well as the Scythian foremother and therefore the equivalent of ʿAtarʿatah, to Artimpasa.

This affiliation was so close that the images of the two goddesses would almost merge, but nevertheless remained distinct from each other, and this distinction is more clear in how Artimpasa was assigned the role of the king's sexual partner (see below) and the divine power of the kings who granted royal power, but was not considered the foremother of the people, and in how neither the Bosporan kings of Sarmatian ancestry nor the Graeco-Roman authors' records assigned Aphroditē or Artimpasa as the Scythians' ancestor.

=== Persian influences ===
Other influences on Artimpasa include that of the fellow Iranian goddess Anāhitā, whose closeness to Arti enabled the merging of her traits into Artimpasa. Anāhitā's triple name, 𐬀𐬭𐬆𐬛𐬎𐬎𐬍⸱𐬯𐬏𐬭𐬁⸱𐬀𐬥𐬁𐬵𐬌𐬙𐬀 (Arəduuī Sūrā Anāhitā), meaning "The Humid, Strong, and Immaculate" respectively represented the three functions of fecundity, sovereignty, and priestly force, which were also functions present in Artimpasa, as were also Anāhitā's functions as an ancient fertility goddess influenced by the Assyro-Babylonian Ištar-ʿAštart, her later orgiastic rites, and her roles as a warrior and victory-granting goddess. The cult of Artimpasa had transformed into one of the divine patron of the royal dynasty by the 4th century BCE, reflecting the absorption of Anāhitā's role as a divine patroness of the king and a giver of royal power by Artimpasa, as well as the influence on Artimpasa of the role of the Levantine Great Goddesses as grantors of divine power to the king.

== Cult ==
=== Functions ===
Artimpasa was a goddess of warfare, sovereignty, priestly force, fecundity, vegetation and fertility.

=== Regional variants ===
==== Astara ====
Artimpasa was known under the name of Ασταρα (Astara; Latin: Astara) by the Sindo-Maeotians, a name which was derived from that of ʿAštart. Like Artimpasa, Astara's paredrus was a male deity who was a local form of Targī̆tavah named Sanerges (Σανεργες) who was identified with the Greek Hēraklēs,.

=== Greek identifications ===
Due to the assimilation by Artimpasa of the traits of Ištar-ʿAštart, the Greeks on the northern shores of the Black Sea identified Artimpasa with their own goddess Aphroditē Ourania (Αφροδιτη Ουρανια) and the Scythians themselves in turn assimilated Aphroditē Ourania with Artimpasa. Due to this association, multiple depictions of Greek-style and Greek-made Aphroditē and Erōs have been found in the tombs of Scythian nobles. The Greek author Herodotus of Halicarnassus would later also equate Artimpasa with the Greek goddess Aphroditē Ourania, who herself presided over productivity in the material world.

Artimpasa was also identified with the Greek goddess Athēna (Αθηνα) in the Bosporan Kingdom due to her warrior aspects.

=== Iconography ===
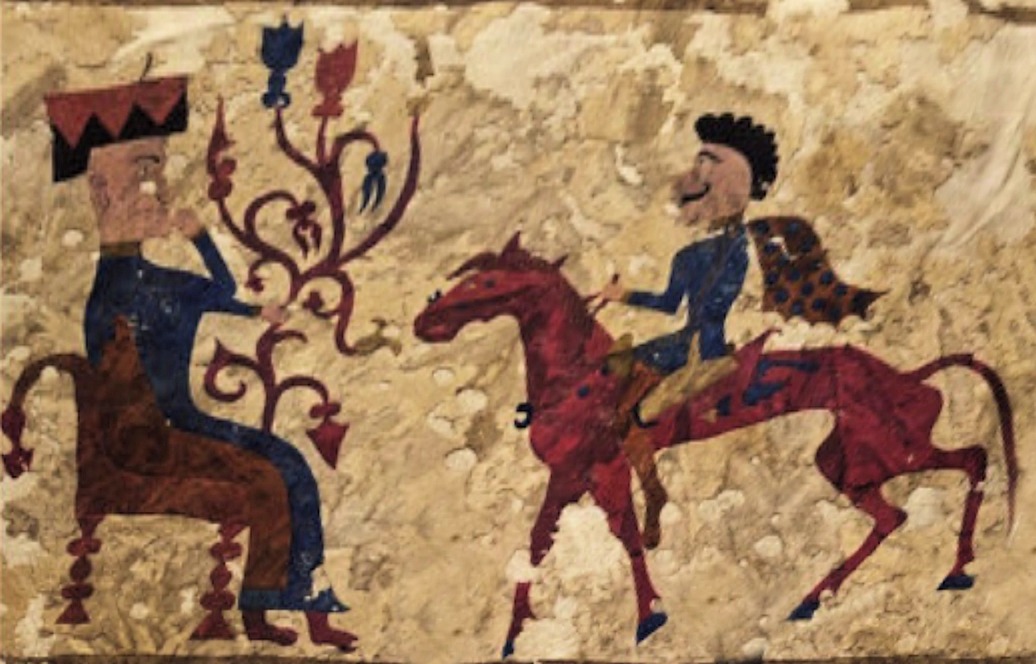
Decorated tapestry with a seated goddess (Artimpasa) and Scythian rider, Pazyryk Kurgan 5, Altai, Southern Russia c.241 BCE.

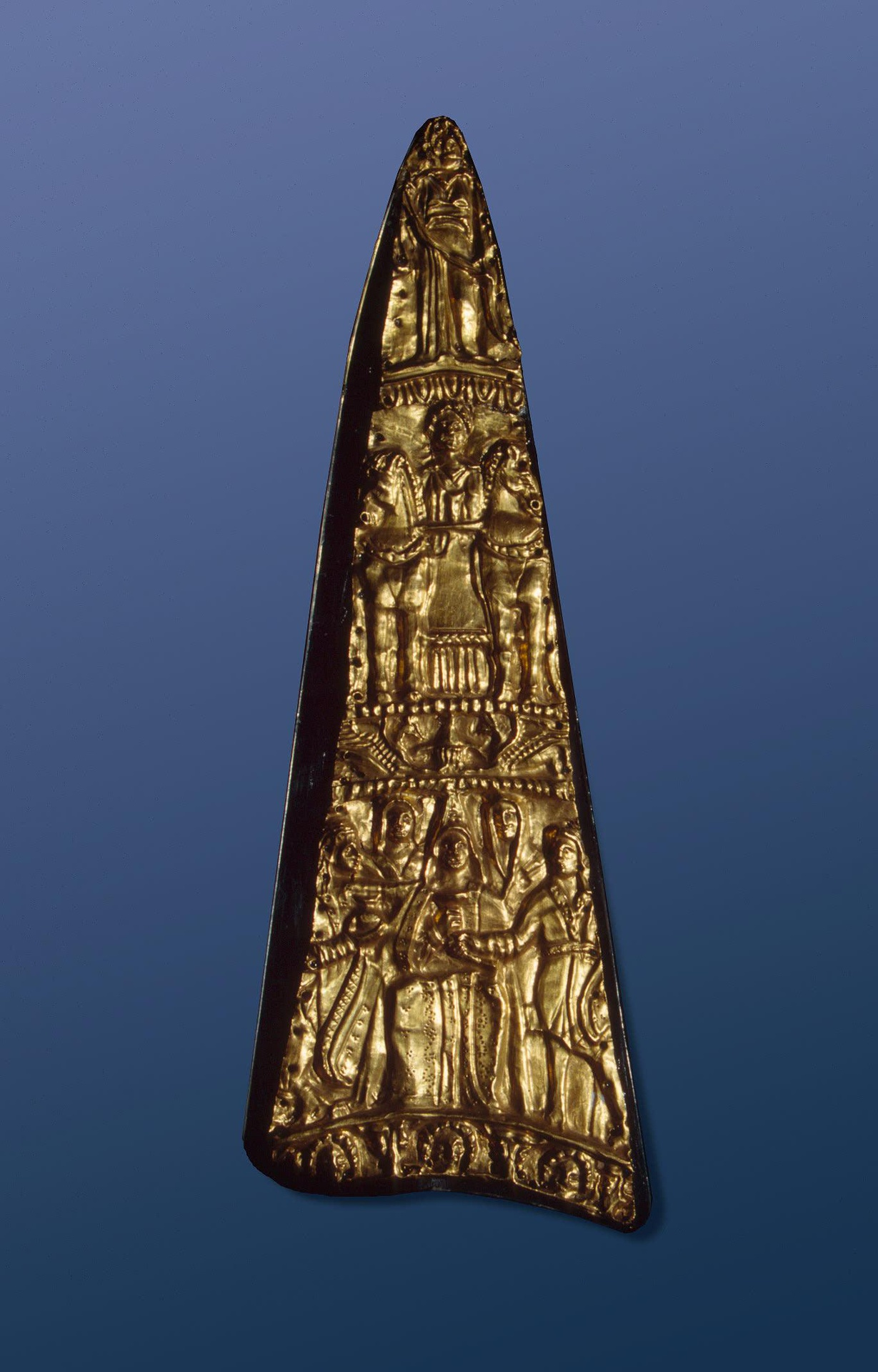
The Karagodeuashkh kurgan headdress

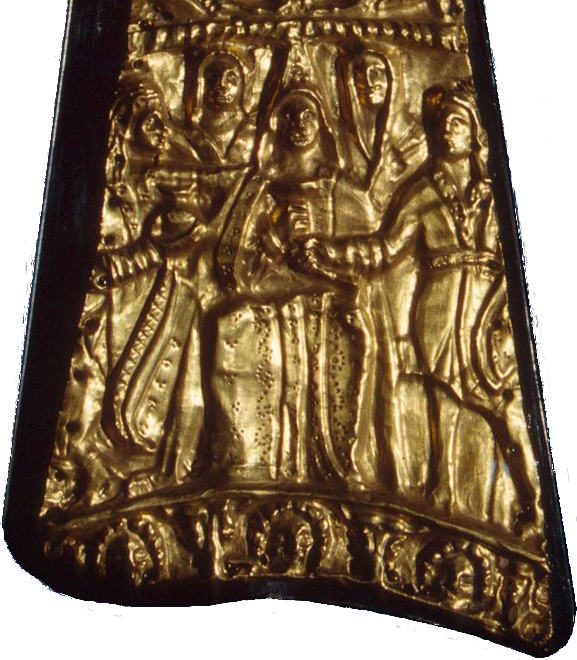
Detail of the Karagodeuashkh kurgan headdress, with the bottom row depicting Artimpasa or her chief priestess in the center surrounded the Divine Twins and her attendants

==== The winged Artimpasa ====
Artimpasa was a potnia thērōn, and was depicted as such on a mirror from the Kelermes kurgan, whose circle was divided into eight equal segments portraying demons, animals, and semi-bestial men, and was dominated by the goddess, winged, and holding two panthers in her spread hands. This imagery might have been influenced directly and indirectly (via the intermediary of orientalizing Greek art from Ionia) by the Levantine depictions of Inanna-Ištar, who was portrayed as winged as symbol of her being a celestial and warrior goddess, and was also represented as a potnia thērōn holding animals in both her hands or surrounded by animals, and whose warrior nature was shown in her representations as a Mistress of Animals holding weapons.

A Sarmatian phalera decorated with an image of a winged Aphroditē with her head decorated with leaves, and holding a small round object in one hand and a rosette in the other hand was found in the Yanchorak treasure from the 2nd to 1st centuries BCE. This phalera was part of a horse harness and the Sarmatians who copied a Greek representation of Aphroditē associated her image with their own goddess. These representations also characterise Artimpasa as a potnia hippōn alongside her status as a potnia thērōn.

Another winged depiction of Artimpasa shows her as a winged goddess flanked by deer from a plate found in the Oleksandropilskiy kurhan alongside a sceptre head shaped like the Snake-Legged Goddess affiliated to her. A possibly winged representation of Artimpasa was on a damaged bronze cart beam decoration from Krasnoye Znamya. That this portrayal of the goddess showed her within a radiate circle, implying she was also a solar goddess. Artimpasa role's as a potnia hippōn and the nature of the horse as both solar and chthonic furthermore implied that Artimpasa, although a celestial goddess, was also a killer and earth deity.

==== The seated Artimpasa ====
Another Scythian art motif depicting Artimpasa portrays her as a seated goddess who wears a kalathos with a veil above it and holds a mirror while a young man wearing Scythian clothing and drinking from a rhyton stands in front of her. Although this composition has sometimes been identified as a representation of Tāpayantī, the mirror the goddess holds is more fitting of Artimpasa's role as a goddess of fertility and sexuality and a patroness of the Anarya soothsayers due to the mirror being a symbol of feminine principle, eroticism and fertility which played an important role in the wedding rites of Iranian peoples, as well as a magical object used for prophecy and shamanic rites (the Sarmatians buried their priestesses with mirrors). One pendant from the Kul-Oba kurgan depicts Artimpasa in the centre, with a spherical vessel to her right and an altar or incense burner to her left, representing the consecration by fire (which holds an important place in the marital rites of Iranian peoples) of the communion between the goddess and humanity.

A more complex form of the seated Artimpasa motif is found on a 4th-century BCE headgear gold band from Sakhnova, where the seated Artimpasa holds a mirror and a round vessel, with a bearded Scythian with a gorytos hanging on his belt and holding a rhyton in one hand and a sceptre in the other hand kneels in front of her. To their right are a musician and two "cup-bearers", and to their left is a youth with a fan and two Scythians drinking from the same rhyton (interpreted as "sworn brothers"), and two sacrificers of a ram. This scene is a representation of a sacred feast where the kneeling man, a worshipper or young god, is uniting with the goddess by drinking a holy beverage. This feast is comparable to the orgiastic festival of Sakaia (Σακαια) which was celebrated in Pontos in honour of Anāhitā and was defined as a "Scythian feast" by Hesychius of Alexandria.

A similar artistic motif is that of a horseman facing Artimpasa. One depiction of this scene is from a famous Saka carpet from one of the Pazyryk kurgans in Siberia representing the seated Artimpasa with her right hand raised to her head and her left hand holding a blossoming branch, with a horseman facing her. Another representation of this scene is found on a 1st-century BCE to 1st-century CE relief from the site of Chayka in which a horseman holding a bow approaches a standing woman who holds a round object (which might be a mirror, a spherical vessel or a fruit), with an altar between them.

Another possible Siberian representation of Artimpasa can be found on two belt buckles depicting two dismounted horsemen, one of whom is holding the horses while the other lays in the lap of a goddess whose torso emerges from the earth and whose hair is interwoven with the branches of a tree above her head. This scene might depict the Scythian ritual sleep on the Earth and could be related to the relation between Artimpasa and the divine twins.

The bezel of the signet ring of the Scythian king Scyles was decorated with the image of Artimpasa seated on a throne and holding a mirror in her right hand and a sceptre in her left hand, with Skuleō (ΣΚΥΛΕΩ) engraved near the figure of the goddess, and on whose band was inscribed in Greek Keleoe Argotan par enai (Ancient Greek: ΚΕΛΕΟΕ ΑΡΓΟΤΑΝ ΠΑΡ ΕΝΑΙ, lit. 'Tell to be with Argotas!'), with Argotas being a former Scythian king from whom his descendant Scyles inherited this ring.

==== Astara ====
Depictions of Astara with a horseman facing her have also been found in the Kuban region inhabited by these peoples:

- a 4th century BCE rhyton from the Merdzhany kurgan was decorated with a representation of the seated goddess holding a spherical vessel, with a seven-branched leafless tree (a Tree of Life possibly characterising this scene as a marriage ceremony) on one side of her throne, and a pole with a horse skull (symbolising the importance of horses and horse sacrifice in this goddess's cult) on it on the other side, while mounted god with a rhyton approaches her – the scene represents this Sindo-Maeotian goddess and a local male deity in communion, possibly of marital nature. This scene is also parallel to the scenes of Artimpasa with a male partner, and the presence of the Tree of Life as well as the goddess's link to horses reflect her similarity with Artimpasa, and thus indicate close links between the Scythian and Sindo-Maeotian worship of the fertility and vegetation goddess.
- a relief from the 4th century BCE Trekhbratniy kurgan depicted a small charioteer drawing the horses of a carriage with a naiskos-shaped coach in which is seated a woman who stretches her hand towards a young beardless horseman who has a gorytos hanging on his left hip while another gorytos hands from a pole near the naiskos. The gorytos hanging on the pole might be linked to the custom of the Massagetai described by Hērodotos of Halikarnāssos whereby a man desiring to have sexual intercourse with a woman would hang his gorytos in front of her wagon before proceeding to the act; the hanging gorytos in the Trekhbratniy kurgan relief might thus have been a symbol of sexual union or marriage, and its location near the carriage as well as the handclasp of the woman and the horseman might therefore hint that the scene showed a sacred marriage ceremony. This scene represented the apotheosis of a deceased noblewoman who participated in the worship of the Sindo-Maeotian goddess before her death, with her receiving the status of the goddess depicted in similar scenes alongside the hero after her death. The scene might alternatively have represented the Sindo-Maeotian equivalent of Artimpasa with the hero.

===== The goddess and the divine twins =====
One gold plate which decorated a priestess's headdress which was discovered in the 4th–3rd century BCE Karagodeuashkh kurgan depicting a Sindo-Maeotian form of Artimpasa is divided into three registers corresponding to the division of the universe into three levels of Scythian cosmology:

1. the upper one depicts a woman dressed in a Greek khitōn and himation and holding a cornucopia
2. the middle one depicts a person wearing a khitōn and riding in a chariot carried by two horses
3. the lower one depicts two rows of characters all dressed in Scythian dress, with a woman wearing a complex headgear decorated by a triangular plate and seated in a priestly position dominating the scene, while two beardless youths site by her side on the same bench as her: the youth to the goddess' left holds a round vessel, and the youth to her right has a gorytos on his hip and is either handing a rhyton to the goddess or receiving it from her. In the background, two beardless persons wearing a hood are standing.

The woman in the upper level of the plate was identified an Iranian deity representing fārnā, that is divine bliss, and assimilated with Tukhē, and the charioteer in the middle section has been identified with Gaiϑāsūra.

The three divisions of the Karagodeuashkh plate have also been interpreted as representing the same goddess respectively reigning the world from heaven, driving the sun-chariot in the middle, and accepting the veneration of humans and blessing them in the lower section. The identification of the goddess with the Scytho-Maeotian Aphroditē, that is Artimpasa, is supported by the use of motifs of griffins flanking a thumiatērion, ova, and female masks and boukrania – all symbols of Aphroditē Ourania who was identified with Artimpasa – being respectively used as separations below the three sections of the plate. This identification was further supported by the cornucopia – which was a symbol of fertility and fortune identified with the Iranian fārnā – held by the goddess in the first section; the affiliation of Artimpasa with the chariot-riding Iranian goddess Anāhitā; and the presence of gold pendants in the shape of doves and gorgoneia, both symbols of Aphroditē Ourania, as decorations of the Karagodeuashkh plate and of the headgear which it was part of.

The third division's scene has been interpreted as depicting either the worship of the Scytho-Maeotian ʿAštart-Anāhitā, that is of Artimpasa, or the goddess granting power to the youth with the rhyton. Although the youth with the rhyton was visually similar to that of the male figure of the seated Artimpasa compositions, he differed from the latter in that both youths in the Karagodeuashkh plate were represented as equals and seated on the same bench as the goddess, which signaled their divine nature – however the twin gods' smaller statures compared to the goddess, who dominated the scene, implied they were of an inferior rank to her in the mythical hierarchy and were in the rank of divine heroes. This scene therefore represented the Indo-European triad of the Great Goddess with the divine twins, itself related to the connection between the pre-Zoroastrian Anāhitā and the Nanghaithya twins, ultimately derived from the Indo-European theme of the divine twins as the companions of the Mother Goddess who flanked her symbol of the Tree of Life. Thus, the scene on the Karagodeuashkh plate also represented a Scythian form of the cult of the divine twins.

The divine nature of all the other beings represented on the Karagodeuashkh plate implied that the two hooded figures in the background of the scene could not have been eunuch priests and therefore might have instead represented mythological attendants of Artimpasa of unclear significance in the scene.

The Karagodeuashkh plate thus depicted a communion of Artimpasa with a pair of heroes which therefore represented concepts of eternal life and resurrection and divine legitimation of royal power.

==== Interpretation ====
These representations of Artimpasa have been interpreted as depicting the adoration or communion of Artimpasa and a god or a mortal, and more specifically as the granting of divine benediction to a king, or an investiture, or a sacred marriage. The rhyta and the spherical vessels like the one depicted in the Sakhnova band were used for drinking sacred beverages consumed in religious rituals. The spherical vessels specifically were widely used in the rituals of Iranian peoples, and large numbers of them have been found in Scythian sites, and their ornamentation typically consisting of vegetal and solar imagery as well as their depiction in Scythian art where they are held or being offered to a goddess associate them with Artimpasa.

These depictions represent the male figure, who is often a standing youth of smaller stature than the goddess, as subordinate to Artimpasa, who remains seated. This artistic composition reflects a divine marriage of the goddess with a younger god, similar to the union of Kubeleya and Attis or of Aphroditē and Adōnis, or a deified mortal identified with a god or a hero, likely the Scythian forefather Targī̆tavah. These scenes represent this younger god receiving grace endowed by the goddess upon him after the communion. In some variants of this scene, the male partner of the goddess is bearded and is more imposing on horseback, which, if not simply a local artistic variation, reflected the increasing prominence of a warrior god in this ritual.

The image of the seated Artimpasa on the signet ring of Scyles who held a mirror and a sceptre represented communion with the goddess as guaranteeing sovereignty in Scythian religion. The image of the Artimpasa on the ring was therefore a representation of her as a granter of sovereignty, with the ring having been inherited from generation to generation of the Scythian royal dynasty as a token of royal power, and Argotas was a former Scythian king from whom his descendant Scyles inherited this ring. The ring did not feature any image of the male partner of the goddess because the kings were themselves considered to be these partners, with the Scythian royal investiture having been considered both a communion between man and the goddess as well as a marital union which elevated the king to the status of spouse of the goddess and granted him power through sexual intercourse with the goddess. This was also a reflection of Levantine influence on Artimpasa, since Mesopotamian equivalents of Aphroditē Ourania were sometimes represented together with the king in scenes represented sacred marriages, and the stability of royal power in Paphos was believed to be derived from intimate relations between Aphroditē, with whom the queen of Paphos was identified, and the king, who claimed descent from Aphroditē's lover Kinuras.

These scenes however had multiple interpretations, and the communion with the goddess might have also represented blessing of the worshipper with a promise of afterlife and future resurrection through communion with the goddess, as well as an endowment of the king with royal power, reflecting Artimpasa's role as a giver of power and victory, which also explains why all the variants of the scene of the seated goddess and a male partner were found in the tombs of Scythian nobility.

=== Clergy ===
The cult of Artimpasa was performed by the Anarya, who were powerful priestesses from the most noble families affiliated to an orgiastic cult of the goddess.

The Anarya were assigned male at birth but underwent a spiritual and divine transformation, performing the same gender roles as other women.

== See also ==
- Bahuchara Mata, an Indo-Aryan goddess also connected to gender variant people.

== Sources ==
- Raevskiy, Dmitriy (1993). Marazov, Ivan (ed.). Scythian Mythology. Sofia, Bulgaria: Secor Publishers. ISBN 978-9-548-25002-3.
- Safaee, Yazdan (2020). "Scythian and Zoroastrian Earth Goddesses: A Comparative Study on Api and Ārmaiti". In Niknami, Kamal-Aldin; Hozhabri, Ali (eds.). Archaeology of Iran in the Historical Period. University of Tehran Science and Humanities Series. Cham, Germany: Springer International Publishing. pp. 65–75. doi:10.1007/978-3-030-41776-5_6. ISBN 978-3-030-41776-5. S2CID 219515548.
- Ustinova, Yulia (1999). The Supreme Gods of the Bosporan Kingdom: Celestial Aphrodite and the Most High God. Leiden, Netherlands; Boston, United States. ISBN 978-9-004-11231-5.
