= Snake-Legged Goddess =

Scythian goddess

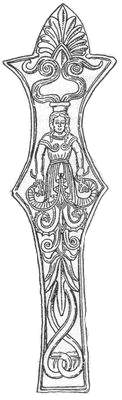
- A depiction of the Snake-Legged Goddess on a horse plate from Tsymbalova mohyla
- Affiliation: Artimpasa
- Gender: Female
- Region: Eurasian steppe
- Ethnic group: Scythic peoples
- Parents: Api and a river-deity
- Consort: Targī̆tavah
- Offspring: Lipoxšaya, Arbuxšaya, and Kolaxšaya or Agathyrsos, Gelōnos, and Skythēs

Equivalents
- Greek: Derketō
- Aramaean: ʿAtarʿatah

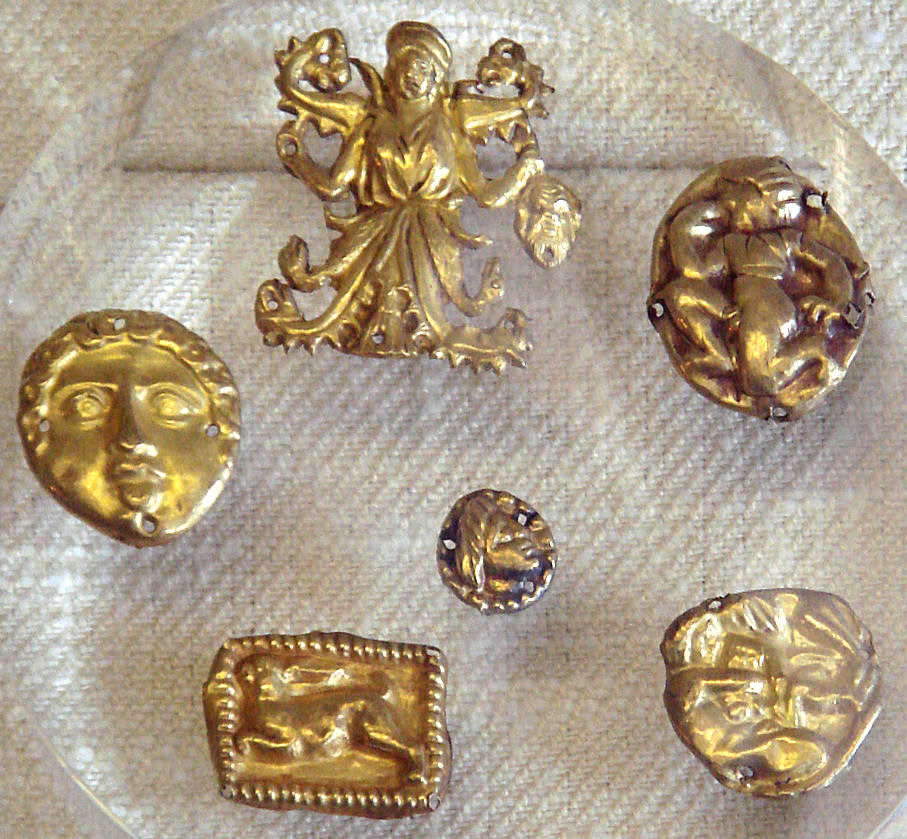
The Snake-Legged Goddess (top)

The Snake-Legged Goddess, also referred to as the Anguipede Goddess, was the ancestor-goddess of the Scythians according to the Scythian religion.

== Name ==
The "Snake-Legged Goddess" or "Anguiped Goddess" is the modern-day name of this goddess, who is so called because several representations of her depict her as a goddess with snakes or tendrils as legs.

== History ==
=== Origin ===
The Snake-Legged Goddess and her role as the foremother of the Scythians had early origins and pre-dated the contacts of the Scythians with Mediterranean religions that influenced the cult of the Great Goddess Artimpasa to whom the Snake-Legged Goddess was affiliated. This goddess appears to have originated from an ancient Iranic tradition.

The snakes which formed the limbs and grew out of the shoulders of Snake-Legged Goddess also linked her to the Zoroastrian chthonic monster Aži Dahāka, of whom a variant appears in later Persian literature as the villainous figure Zahhak, who had snakes growing from each shoulder.

=== West Asian influence ===
During the 7th century BCE, the Scythians expanded into West Asia, during which time the Scythian religion was influenced by the religions of the peoples of the Fertile Crescent. Consequently, the Snake-Legged Goddess was influenced by the Levantine goddess ʿAtarʿatah in several aspects, resulting in a strong resemblance between the two goddesses, such as their monstrous bodies, fertility and vegetation symbolism, legends about their love affairs, and their respective affiliations and near-identification to Artimpasa and Aphroditē Ourania.

Another influence might have been the Graeco-Colchian goddess Leukothea, whose mythology as a woman who was turned into a goddess after throwing herself into the sea due to a curse from Hēra connects her to ʿAtarʿatah, and whose sanctuary at Vani had columns crowned with female protomēs emerging from akanthos leaves similar to those of the Snake-Legged Goddess.

=== Greek contact ===
The Greek poet Hesiod might have mentioned the Snake-Legged Goddess in the Theogony, where he assimilated her to the monstrous figure of Echidna from Greek mythology. In Hesiod's narrative, "Echidna" was a serpent-nymph living in a cave far from any inhabited lands, and the god Targī̆tavah, assimilated to Heracles, killed two of her children, namely the hydra of Lerna and the lion of Nemea. Thus, in this story, "Heracles" functioned as a destroyer of evils and a patron of human dwellings located in place where destruction had previously prevailed.

The Snake-Legged Goddess is however most famously known from the various Graeco-Roman retellings of the Scythian genealogical myth, in which she unites with the god Targī̆tavah to become the mother of the first ancestors of the Scythians and their kings.

== Cult ==
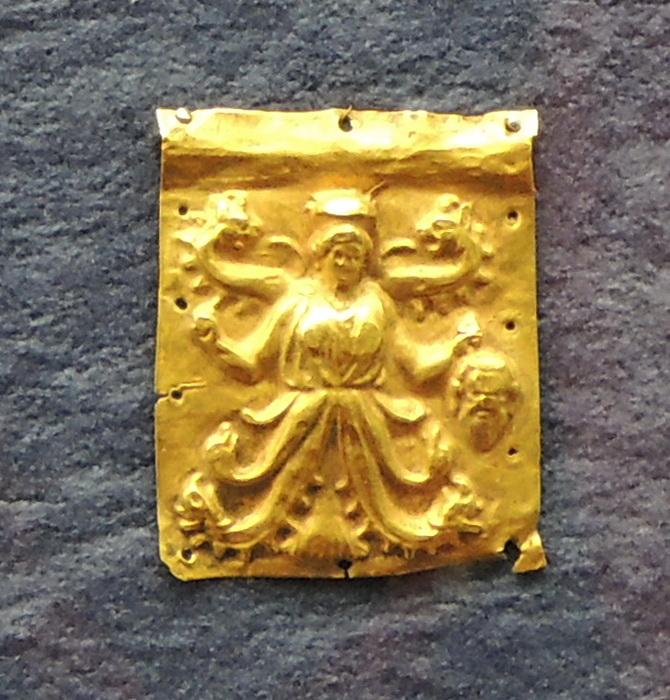
4th century BC, Krasnodar region, Russia

=== Functions ===
The Scythian Snake-Legged Goddess was a primordial ancestress of humanity who was associated to the life-giving principle but also possessed a chthonic nature, due to which her depictions were placed in Scythian tombs. The status of the Snake-Legged Goddess as the fore-mother of the Scythians associated her with the cult of the ancestors, and, being the controller of the life cycle, was also a granter of eternal life for the deceased.

Some images of Snake-Legged Goddess were discovered in burials, thus assigning both a chthonic and vegetal symbolism to this goddess, which follows the motif of vegetal deities possessing chthonic features. The Snake-Legged Goddess was also a vegetation goddess of the Tree of Life, and as well as a potnia thērōn as attested by the presence of felines near her in Scythian art and the Luristan bronzes.

The depictions of the Snake-Legged Goddess on Scythian horse harness decorations imply that she was also a patroness of horses, which might be connected with the love affair between Targī̆tavah and the goddess beginning after she had kept his mares in the genealogical myth.

==== Affiliation to Artimpasa ====
Reflecting influence from Levantine cults in which the Great Goddess was often accompanied by a minor semi-bestial goddess, the Snake-Legged Goddess, who was also the Scythian foremother, was affiliated to Artimpasa. The Snake-Legged Goddess was so closely affiliated to Artimpasa that it bordered on identification to the point where the images of the two goddesses would almost merge, but nevertheless remained distinct from each other.

This distinctiveness is more clear in how Artimpasa was assigned the role of the king's sexual partner and the divine power of the kings who granted royal power, but was not considered the foremother of the people, and in how neither the Bosporan kings of Sarmatian ancestry nor the Graeco-Roman authors' records assigned Aphroditē or Artimpasa as the Scythians' ancestor.

==== Association to Targī̆tavah ====
The Snake-Legged Goddess might have been associated with Targī̆tavah in the latter's role as the father of her three sons and his tentatively suggested role of a snake-god identified by the Greeks of Pontic Olbia with Achilles Pontarkhēs (lit. 'Achilles, Lord of the Pontic Sea').

Sailors had to pass through this cult site of Targī̆tavah-Achilles at the island of Borysthenes to reach Cape Hippolaus, where was located a sacred grove to the Greek goddess Hecate, with whom the Greeks had assimilated the Scythian Snake-Legged Goddess.

=== Mythology ===
The Snake-Legged appears in all variations of the Scythian genealogical myth as the Scythian fore-mother who sires the ancestor and first king of the Scythians with Targī̆tavah.

The Snake-Legged appears in all variations of the Scythian genealogical myth with consistent traits, including her being the daughter of either a river-god or of the Earth and dwelling in a cave, as well as her being half-woman and half-snake.

Diodorus of Sicily's description of this goddess in his retelling of the genealogical myth as an "anguiped earth-born maiden" implies that she was a daughter of Api, likely through a river-god, and therefore was both chthonic and connected to water, but was however not identical with Api herself and instead belonged to a younger generation of deities of "lower status" who were more actively involved in human life.

=== Iconography ===
==== The Goddess with Snake Legs ====
Several representations are known of the Snake-Legged Goddess, often crafted by Greek artisans for the Scythian market, most of them depicting her as a goddess with snake-shaped legs or tendrils as legs, and some depicting her as winged, with griffin heads growing below her waist or holding a severed head, with many of them having been found discovered in burials, thus assigning both a chthonic and vegetal symbolism to the goddess, which follows the motif of vegetal deities possessing chthonic features.

The connection of the Snake-Legged Goddess to the life-giving principle is attested by her posture where her hands and legs were spread wide, which constituted a "birth-giving attitude." This complex imagery thus reflected the combination of human motherhood, vegetation and animal life within the Snake-Legged Goddess. The connection of the Snake-Legged Goddess to the life-giving principle is attested by her posture where her hands and legs were spread wide, which constituted a "birth-giving attitude." This complex imagery thus reflected the combination of human motherhood, vegetation and animal life within the Snake-Legged Goddess. Some images of Snake-Legged Goddess were discovered in burials, thus assigning both a chthonic and vegetal symbolism to this goddess, which follows the motif of vegetal deities possessing chthonic features.

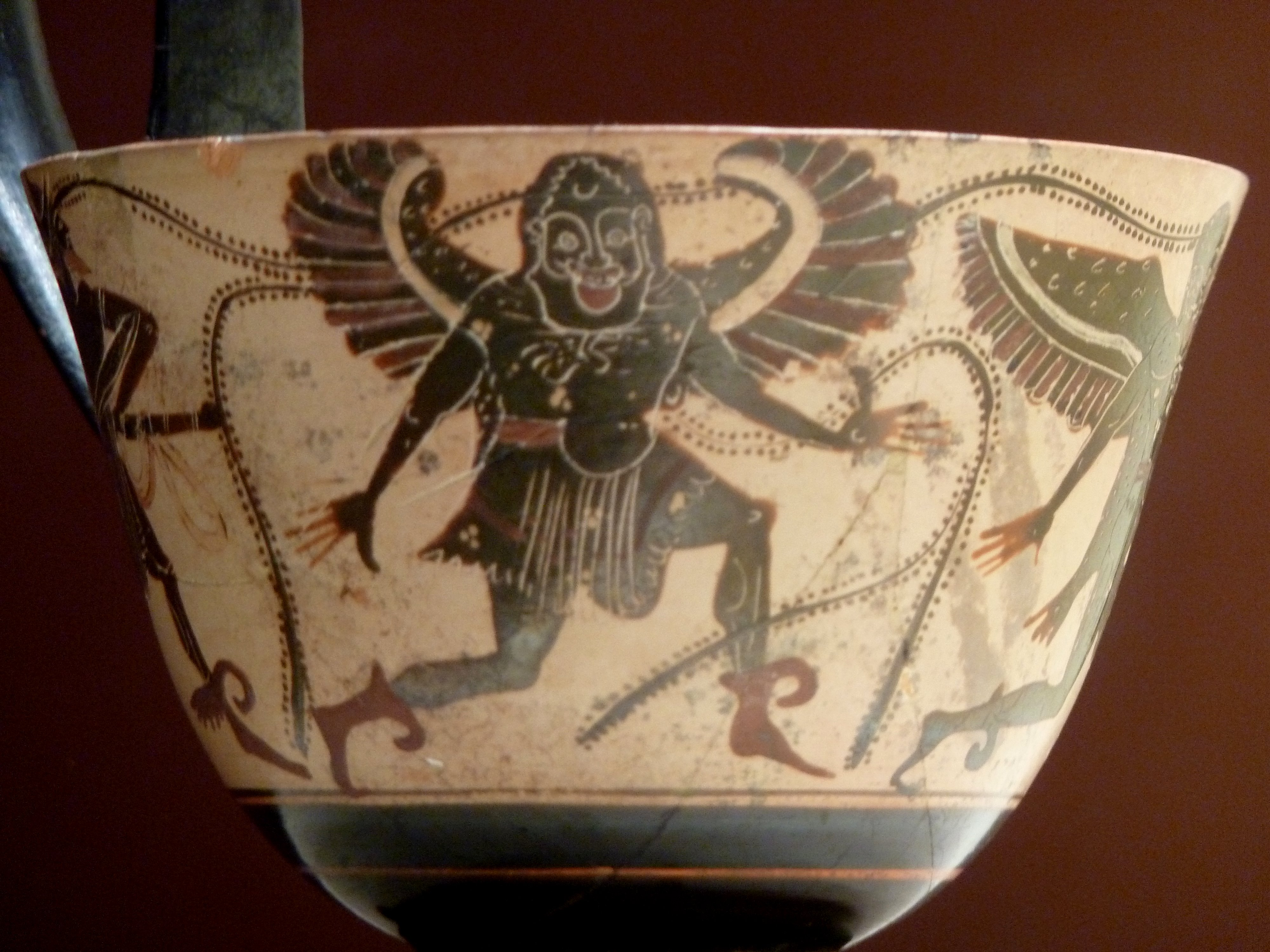
A winged Gorgon. 6th century BCE Greek pottery.

The snakes also connected the Snake-Legged Goddess to the Greek Medusa, and Greek-manufactured representations of Medousa, especially in the form of pendants found in the tombs of Scythian nobles, were very popular in Scythia due to her association with the Snake-Legged Goddess. Possible depictions of the goddess as a potnia thērōn in the form of Medousa have also been found in Scythian art, with a damaged rhyton from the Kelermes kurgan depicting her as a winged running deity with small wings on non-serpentiform legs and flanked by griffins on both sides, and a gold plate from the Shakhan kurgan being decorated with the image of a winged deity holding two animals.

The Snake-Legged Goddess is represented with wings on pendants from the Bolshaya Bliznitza kurgan and the Ust-Labinskaya site, and a similar pendant was found in a vault from Hellenistic Chersonesus along with pendants representing severed heads. A fore-piece from a set of horse head plates from the Tsymbalova mohyla is decorated with an image of the Snake-Legged Goddess with snake-legs below which are griffin heads and vegetal tendrils, as well as tendrils above the kalathos hat she wears; this fore-piece was accompanied with phalerae representing Medusa and seilēnoi heads, as well as fish-shaped side pieces due to the possible influence of the Levantine aquatic goddess ʿAtarʿatah on the Snake-Legged Goddess.

Anguipede iconography forerunning that of the Snake-Legged Goddess appears to have originated in ancient Iranic traditions, with a goblet, dated to the early 1st millennium BCE, found in Luristan and being decorated with a two-headed figure with women's breasts, hands, and hips, and reptilian legs, holding gazelles in both of her hands. This imagery then appeared in northern Europe in the Bronze and Iron Ages, and was present in early La Tène art, after which it appeared in the art of late Bronze Age Germania and Scandinavia.

==== The Tendril-Legged Goddess ====
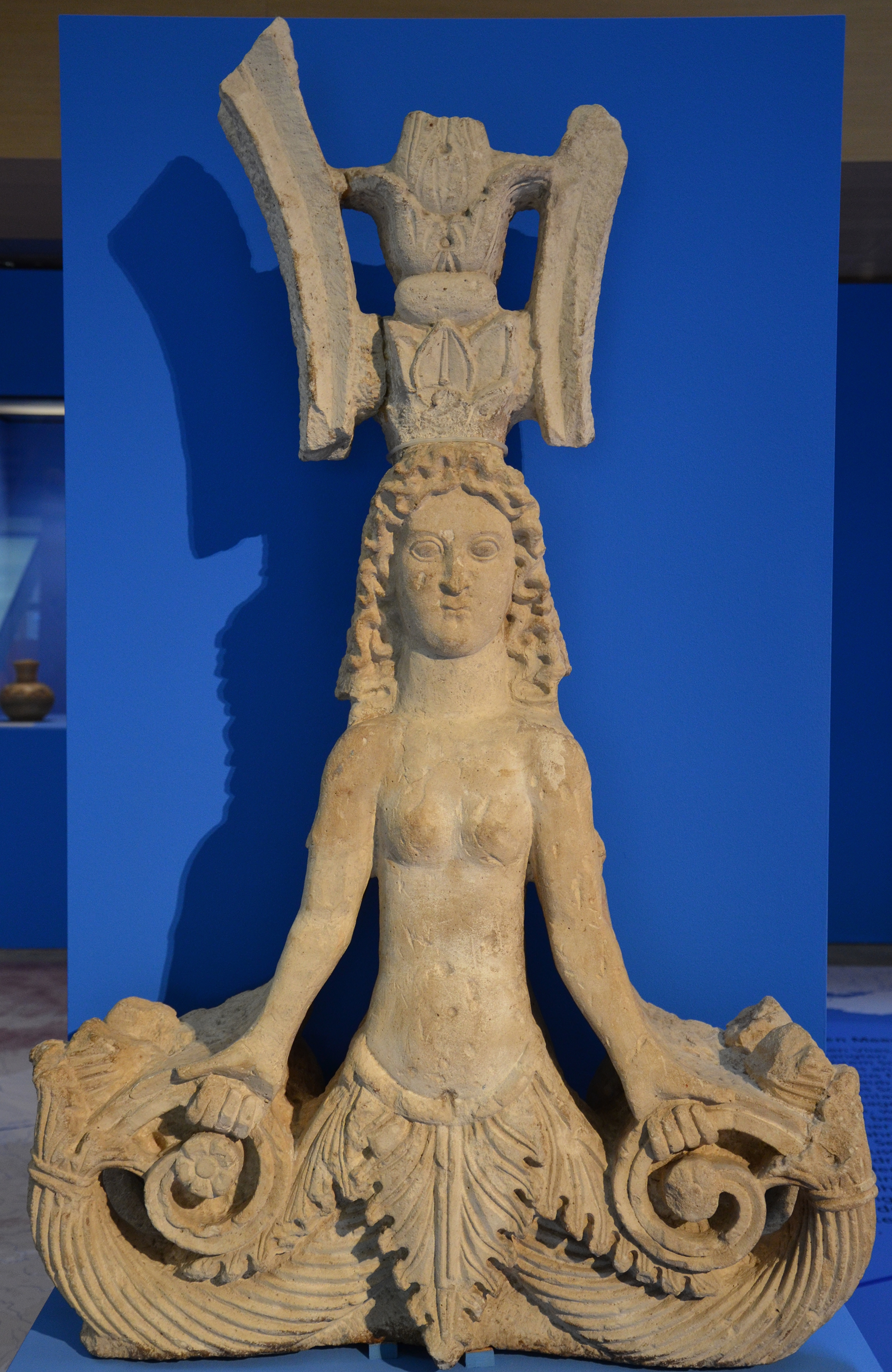
Bosporan variant of the Tendril-Legged Goddess from the 1st to 2nd century AD

The imagery of the Tsymbalova fore-piece formed an intermediary with representations of the goddess depicted with tendrils as legs. Among these depictions are images found in burials of the goddess with tendril-legs, wearing a kalathos hat, and surrounded by vegetal ornamentation; these tendril-legged images of the goddess became more numerous during the first centuries CE, and became a common motif in the design of sarcophagi in the Bosporan kingdom. Among the Scythians, one of the vaults in Scythian Neapolis was decorated with images of small tendril-legged figures along with figures with radiate heads.

From the imagery of the tendril-legged goddess arose a less human and more monstrous type of iconography, which is visible on the earrings from the Butor kurgan, a plate from the Haymanova mohyla kurgan, a silver cup from Mariynskaya, and a silver vessel from the Melitopol kurgan.

==== The Goddess holding a Severed Head ====
The depictions of the Snake-Legged Goddess holding a severed head which represented the sacrificial offering of a man hanging on the Tree of Life, were another example of Levantine influence, since severed human heads appeared in Levantine goddess cults in which the life-granting goddess demanded death, and re-enacted the death of her partner, whom she loved, emasculated, and killed.

The Snake-Legged Goddess therefore also had a blood-thirsty aspect, and there is attestation of human sacrifices to local goddesses accompanied by the exposure of the victims' severed heads on the northern Black Sea coast; one such head placed on an altar close to a representation of a vegetation goddess was discovered in the Sarmatian town of Ilutarum.

The Scythian practice of severing the heads of all enemies they killed in battle and bringing them to their kings in exchange of war booty, the depictions of warriors near or holding severed heads in Scythian art, as well as the pendants shaped like satyr heads found in the same structures as the representations of the Snake-Legged Goddess and of Artimpasa might have been connected with this aspect of the Snake-Legged Goddess.

==== The Goddess with Raised Hands ====
Multiple headgear pendants from three kurgans respectively found in Mastyuginskiy, Tovsta Mohyla, and Lyubimovskiy have been discovered which represent a goddess with large hands raised in a praying gestures and sitting on the protomēs of two lions in profile. The posture of this goddess depicts an imagery which originated in either Luristan or the Caucasus, and has been interpreted as an act of prayer towards a solar or celestial deity. The depiction of this goddess from the Tovsta Mohyla kurgan shows her half-nude, with uncovered breasts and wearing only a cross-belt above the skirt. The nudity of the Goddess with Raised Hands connect hers with the Snake-Legged Goddess, who is often depicted in topless dress, and with Artimpasa.

A later Bosporan goddess in the same praying gesture is depicted with leaf-shaped or branch-shaped hands. Like the earlier goddess with raised hands, this goddess sits on two lions or on a throne flanked by lions. The leaf-shaped hands of this goddess as well as the wild animals on her sides connect her with the tendril-legged form of the Snake-Legged Goddess, and therefore to Artimpasa.

==== The Bearded Goddess ====
The Snake-Legged Goddess was represented on a diadem from the Kul-Oba kurgan as bearded and winged while wearing a kalathos hat and having tendril-shaped legs ending in sea-monsters from which sprouted pomegranates being eaten by birds.

The Snake-Legged Goddess was depicted in an androgynous form on a 4th-century BCE akrōtērion from the Pontic Steppe region, with her image represented her as bearded and her tendril-limbed form, while she wears a kalathos headdress topped with a palmette and holds unicorn panthers or lions by their horns. The breasts of the nude torso of this sculpture, as well as the felines flanking her, which are characteristic of potnia thērōn goddesses, mark her as goddess rather than a god.

A similar image was found at Olynthos, in which a bearded winged deity with an ornament that emphasises her breasts is depicted with two panthers emerging from beneath her waist between which are a dove. The style of the panthers emerging from the goddess's waist was similar to her image from the horse plate from the Tsymbalova Mohyla.

The Snake-Legged Goddess was also represented in her androgynous form on two 4th-century BCE marble thrones from Athens, each decorated with the image of a winged and bearded deity with a kalathos hat on the head and wearing women's clothes while holding the ends of vegetal tendrils. The kalathos was itself an attribute of feminine rather than masculine deities, as were the felines flanking her which are characteristic of potnia thērōn goddesses

Another 4th-century BC representation of the Snake-Legged in her androgynous form found at Athens was a bearded figure decorating a column base wearing women's clothing and a kalathos hat, alongside whom were winged unicorn-panthers. Here too, the kalathos was itself an attribute of feminine rather than masculine deities, as were the felines flanking her which are characteristic of potnia thērōn goddesses

==== Interpretation ====
The snake aspect of the goddess is linked to the complex symbology of snakes in various religions due to their ability to disappear into the ground, their venom, the shedding of their skin, their fertility, and their coiling movements, which are associated with the underworld, death, renewal, and fertility: being able to pass from the worlds above and below the earth, as well as of bringing both death and prosperity, snakes were symbols of fertility and revival.

The tendril limbs of the goddess also had a similar function, and they represented fertility, prosperity, renewal, and the after life because they grow from the Earth within which the dead were placed and blossom again each year.

The Snake-Legged Goddess was thus a liminal figure who founded a dynasty, and was only half-human in appearance while still looking like snake, itself being a creature capable of passing between the worlds of the living and of the dead with no hindrance.

The shapes of the representations of the Snake-Legged Goddess are similar to that of the Tree of Life connecting the upper and lower spheres of the Universe as well as symbolising supreme life-giving power, and therefore merging with the image of the fertility goddess, and was additionally linked to the Iranian creation myth of the Simorğ bird resting on the Saēna Tree. The snakes and griffins as well as representations of the Snake-Legged Goddess alongside predatory feline animals also characterised her as a potnia thērōn in addition to being a vegetation goddess of the Tree of Life.

Like Artimpasa, the Snake-Legged Goddess was also a feminine deity who nevertheless appeared in an androgynous form in ritual and cult, as well as in iconography and ritual. This androgyny represented the full inclusiveness of the Snake-Legged Goddess in her role as the primordial ancestress of humanity. The androgyny of the Snake-Legged Goddess also enhanced her inherent duality represented by her snake and tendril limbs.

In the Scythian genealogical myth, the snake legs of the mother goddess and her dwelling place within the earth marked her as a native of Scythia. The ambiguous features of the mother goddess, such as her being both human and animal, high-ranking and base, monstrous and seductive, at the same time, corresponded to Greek perceptions of Scythian natives. Therefore, although she ruled over the land, her kingdom was empty, cold, uninhabited, and without any signs of civilisation. The role of the Snake-Legged Goddess in the genealogical myth is not unlike those of sirens and similar non-human beings in Greek mythology, who existed as transgressive women living outside of society and refusing to submit to the yoke of marriage, but instead chose their partners and forced them to join her. Nevertheless, unlike the creatures of Greek myth, the Scythian serpent-maiden did not kill Hēraklēs, who tries to win his freedom from her.

==== Greek identifications ====
The Greeks of Pontic Olbia, who held the shrine of Hylaea as common to both the Scythians and themselves, often identified the Snake-Legged Goddess with their own goddesses Demeter and Hecate.

Representations of Demeter and her daughter Persephone on Greek-manufactured Scythian decorative plates might have been connected to this identification of the Snake-Legged Goddess with Demeter.

=== Shrines ===
A Greek language inscription from the later 6th century BCE recorded the existence of a shrine at which were located altars to:

- the god of the Borysthenēs river;
- Targī̆tavah, referred to in the inscription as Herakles;
- the Snake-Legged Goddess, referred to in the inscription as the "Mother of the Gods," likely because the Greeks identified with their own mother of the gods, Cybele, due to her chthonic nature.

The inscription located this shrine in the wooded region of Hylaea, where, according to the Scythian genealogical myth, was located the residence of the Snake-Legged Goddess, and where she and Targī̆tavah became the ancestors of the Scythians; the deities to whom the altars of the shrine were dedicated to were all present in the Scythian genealogical myth. The altars at the shrine of Hylaea were located in open air, and were not placed within any larger structure or building.

=== Clergy ===
The Anarya, who were a transvestite priesthood of Artimpasa, were also connected to the cult of the Snake-Legged Goddess.

=== Rites ===
The Snake-Legged Goddess's image was used in shamanic rites due to her affiliation with Artimpasa, with one of the sceptres from the Oleksandropilskiy kurhan having been found decorated with a depiction of her, and the other sceptre heads being furnished with bells or decorated with schematic trees with birds sitting on them.

Women performed rituals at the shrine of Hylaea where was located an altar to the Snake-Legged Goddess, and the Scythian prince Anacharsis was killed by his brother, the king Saulius, for having offered sacrifices to the Snake-Legged Goddess at this shrine.

== Outside of Scythia ==
=== The Kuban Region ===
Depictions of the Snake-Legged Goddess were also found in the Sindo-Maeotian areas on the Asian side of the Cimmerian Bosporus, and her representations in her tendril-legged form became more predominant in the first centuries CE and appeared in Bosporan Greek cities, where they became a common design on sarcophagi, as well as in graves in Chersonesus.

=== The Kingdom of the Bosporus ===
A possible Sindo-Maeotian variant of the Snake-Legged Goddess appears in the Kingdom of the Bosporus under the name of Aphroditē Apatouros (Αφροδιτη Απατουρος). The goddess's epithet Apatouros (Απατουρος) was derived from a name in a Sindian dialect of Scythian meaning "mighty water" or "quick water" composed of the terms ap-, meaning "water," and tura-, meaning "quick" or "mighty." The cult of this goddess was of indigenous Sindo-Maeotian origin and was adopted by the Greeks, who syncretised her with their own Aphroditē Ourania when they colonised the Taman Peninsula.

Since the ancient Greeks did not understand the meaning of the epithet Apatura, Strabo attempted to explain it as being derived from the Greek word apatē (απατη), meaning "treachery," through a retelling of a legend about this goddess, according to which she had been attacked by Giants and called on "Hēraklēs," that is the god Targī̆tavah, for help. After concealing "Hēraklēs," the goddess, under guise of introducing the Giants one by one, treacherously handed them to "Hēraklēs," who killed them.

This legend of Aphroditē Apatouros and the Giants has tentatively been suggested to have been part of the same narrative as the Scythian genealogical myth. According to this hypothesis, the reward of Aphroditē Apatouros to "Hēraklēs" for defeating the Giants would have been her love.

=== Southern Crimea ===
The Taurian Parthenos (Παρθενος), the goddess to whom, according to Herodotus of Halicarnassus, the Tauroi sacrificed ship-wrecked men and Greeks captured in sea-raids and exposed their heads on a pole, might have been another form of the Snake-Legged Goddess worshipped by non-Scythians.

=== Thrace ===
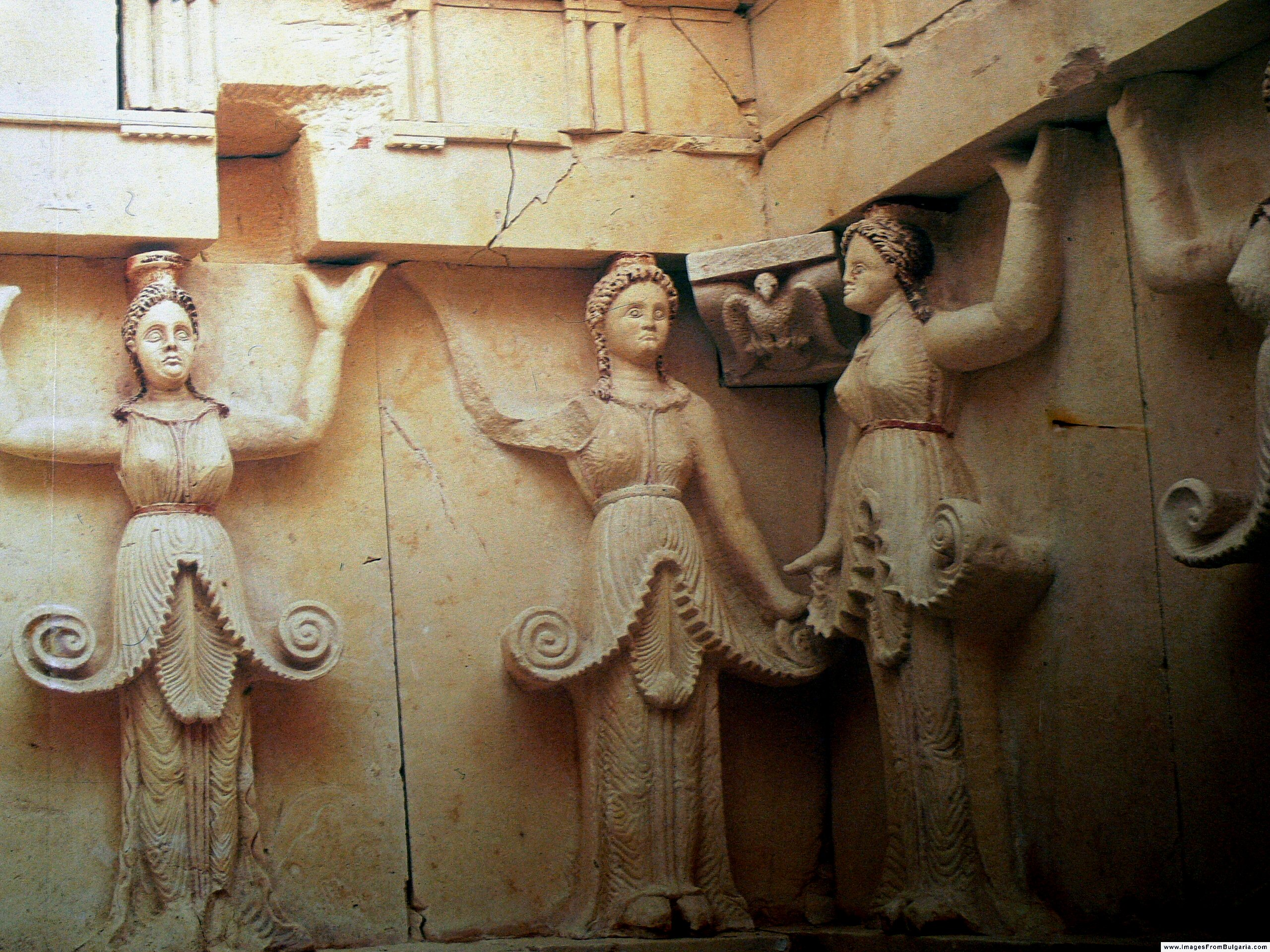
The karyatides of the Thracian Tomb of Sveshtari depicting the Thracian variants of the Snake-legged Goddess

Thracian interpretations of the Scythian Snake-Legged Goddess appear in the Thracian Tomb of Sveshtari as karyatides with feminine bodies wearing kalathoi hats and khitōns with pleats shaped like floral volutes which have an akanthos between them. Their disproportionally large raised hands, which either hold the volutes or are raised to appear as supporting the entablature, are similar to the goddess with her hands raised to her face depicted on a series of Thracian votive plaques. Above the karyatides, a wall painting depicts a goddess holding a crown and reaching out to an approaching horseman. The overall scene represents a Thracian nobleman's posthumous heroisation and depicts the same elements of the Great Goddess-minor goddess complex found in the relation between Artimpasa and the Snake-Legged Goddess.

A Thracian equivalent of the Snake-Legged Goddess might also appear in the series of horse bridle plaques from Letnitsa. One of the plaques depicts a seated male figure (an ancestral hero and likely Thracian equivalent of the Scythian "Hēraklēs") with a female figure (the Thracian Great Goddess) straddling him from above, both of them explicitly engaging in sexual intercourse, and symbolising the king's acquirement of royal power through intercourse with the Great Goddess similarly to the Scythian king's obtaining of royal power through his union with Artimpasa. Behind the Great Goddess is another woman, holding a vessel in one hand and in the other one a branch which obscures the view of the hero; this figure is a vegetation goddess with an ectatic aspect, which is symbolised by the vessel she holds, which contains a sacred beverage, and whose connection to the Great Goddess is analogous to that of the Snake-Legged Goddess with Artimpasa.

Several Thracian stelae and votive plaques have also been discovered depicting a horseman facing a standing or seated Great Goddess while a tree with a coiling snake stands between them, attesting of the similarity of the Thracian and Scythian conceptions of the Great Goddess and the affiliation to her of a snake goddess who was considered the foremother of the people.

=== In Greece ===
In the late 5th century BCE, imagery inspired by the Snake-Legged Goddess started appearing in Greece, with feminine protomēs emerging from scroll ornaments being painted on Attic vases, among which two lēkythoi were adorned with the depictions of a female helmeted head between branches.

The image of the Snake- and Tendril-Legged Goddess later became prevalent in northern Greece during the 4th century BC, where feminine half-figures wearing kalathoi hats and foliate skirts appear in Macedonia on a mosaic from the palace of Aigai, and a winged tendril-legged goddess wearing a kalathos had was depicted on the gables of 4th-century BCE tombstones from Aigai.

At Perinthus, feminine figures rising from akanthos leaves were depicted on 4th-century BC pilaster capitals, and the images of two human figures transforming into akanthos stalks at the waist decorated a tomb stele in Aetolia. A feminine head emerging from florals was depicted on a mosaic floor from Epidamnos in Illyria.

In the late 4th century BCE, the Snake-Legged Goddess was sculpted on a capital from the Cypriot city of Salamis, which was a centre of the worship of ʿAštart-Aphroditē.

The image of the Snake-Legged Goddess was popular in Chalcidice, and the tombstone found at Athens of one Philppos son of Phoryskos from Pallēnē in Chalcidice had an akrōtērion decorated with a farewell scene depicting the Snake-Legged Goddess.

A tendril-limbed winged goddess decorated a gold diadem from Eretria, and similar representations were found on 4th and 3rd century BCE gold diadems, on one of which the goddess is flanked by griffins while this image is repeated six times on another one.

During the Hellenistic period, the decoration of the Parthenōn at Athens included a relief of a tendril-limbed winged goddess accompanied by a small lion hiding under the foliage.

The image of the goddess with vegetal shoots as legs became popular at the main cult centres of various goddesses in Hellenistic Anatolia, and the image of a winged feminine torso wearing a kalathos hat emerging from akanthos leaves decorated the akrōtērion of Artemis Leukophryēnē at Magnesia and the capitals of the temple of Zeus Sōsipolis, who was closely connected to Artemis Leukophryēnē. This image also featured in the adornment of 2nd-century BCE "Megaran bowls" made at Pergamum, and on the frieze of the cella of the Artemision at Ephesus, with the dress of the statue of Artemis there being itself decorated with images of nude tendril-limbed figures alternating with bees.

At Aphrodisias, the image of a foliate-skirted goddess holding akanthos stalks decorated the pilaster capitals at the main entrance of the Hadrianic baths.

At Memphis in Egypt, a tendril-limbed goddess decorated the Hellenistic cast of a helmet, and was likely derived from the Macedonian artistic tradition of representing such figures.

At Termessos, the image of the Snake-Legged Goddess appeared on the decorations of the city's theatre, while the propylaia of the temenos of Aphrodite there were decorated with feminine figures emerging from akanthos leaves.

=== In Italy and Rome ===
The image of the tendril-limbed first appeared in Etruscan Cerveteri in the 7th or 6th century BC on a pair of identical gold plaques depicting two branches ending in palmette-like ornaments sprouting from under the chest of a feminine being. These were the earliest representations of such a figure in Etruscan art, and a similar figure appears on a silver cista from Palestrina which was decorated with a feminine head with volutes emerging from her chest above a palmette. The presence of the image of snake-limbed winged feminine beings on a series of Etruscan urns suggests that a figure corresponding to it might have existed in Etruscan mythology.

This image gave rise to a long artistic tradition of depicting a tendril-limbed goddess in Italic art, which continued to feature in art from the later Roman Republic and from the Roman Empire.

The image of the goddess with vegetal shoots as legs remained popular at the main cult centres of various goddesses in Anatolia during the Roman period. The image of a goddess appearing from a floral scroll while leaves sprout from her face and neck also features in the temple of ʿAtarʿatah at Khirbet et-Tannur, and winged feminine figures rigsing from foliage decorated one of the pediments at Baalbek.

The image of a foliate-skirted feminine figure holding floral stems was located at the summit of the entrance of the Temple of Hadrian.

== See also ==
- Serpent symbolism

Mythological goddesses, serpents and snakes

- Illuyanka – serpentine dragon from Hittite mythology and religion
- Nāga – half-human half-snake being, found in Hindu mythology and Buddhist mythology.
- Zahhak – an evil serpent creature, originating in Persian mythology and folklore.
- Celtine
- Shahmaran

== Sources ==
- Braund, David (2007). "Greater Olbia: Ethnic, Religious, Economic, and Political Interactions in the Region of Olbia, c.600–100 BC". In Braund, David; Kryzhintskiy, S. D. [in Russian] (eds.). Classical Olbia and the Scythian World: From the Sixth Century BC to the Second Century AD. Oxford, United Kingdom: Oxford University Press. pp. 33–77. ISBN 978-0-197-26404-1.
- Ivantchik, Askold I. (2016). "L'idéologie royale des Scythes et son expression dans la littérature et l'iconographie grecques : l'apport de la numismatique" [The Royal Ideology of the Scythians and its Expression in Greek Literature and Iconography: the Contribution of Numismatics]. Dialogues d'histoire ancienne [Dialogues of Ancient History] (in French). 42 (1): 305–329.
- Ivantchik, Askold (2018). "Scythians". Encyclopædia Iranica. New York City, United States: Encyclopædia Iranica Foundation; Brill Publishers.
- Lincoln, Bruce (2014). "Once again 'the Scythian' myth of origins (Herodotus 4.5–10)". Nordlit. 33 (33). Tromsø, Norway: Septentrio Academic Publishing on behalf of The University of Tromsø – The Arctic University of Norway: 19–34. doi:10.7557/13.3188.
- Lincoln, Bruce (2018). "Greeks and Scythians in Conversation". Apples and Oranges: Explorations In, On, and With Comparison. Chicago, United States: University of Chicago Press. pp. 84–95. doi:10.7208/9780226564104-009 (inactive July 12, 2025).
- Parzinger, Hermann (2004). Die Skythen [The Scythians] (in German). Munich, Germany: Verlag C.H.Beck. ISBN 978-3-406-50842-4.
- Raevskiy, Dmitriy [in Russian] (1993). Marazov, Ivan (ed.). Scythian Mythology. Sofia, Bulgaria: Secor Publishers. ISBN 978-9-548-25002-3.
- Redondo, Jordi (2022). "The Herodotean Myth on the Origin of the Scythians". In Christopoulos, Menelaos; Papachrysostomou, Athina; Antonopoulos, Andreas P. (eds.). Myth and History: Close Encounters. Berlin, Germany; Boston, United States: Walter de Gruyter GmbH. pp. 167–186. doi:10.1515/9783110780116-011. ISBN 978-3-110-77958-5.
- Rusyayeva, A. S. [in Ukrainian] (2007). "Religious Interactions between Olbia and Scythia". In Braund, David; Kryzhintskiy, S. D. [in Russian] (eds.). Classical Olbia and the Scythian World: From the Sixth Century BC to the Second Century AD. Oxford, United Kingdom: Oxford University Press. pp. 93–102. ISBN 978-0-197-26404-1.
- Ustinova, Yulia (1999). The Supreme Gods of the Bosporan Kingdom: Celestial Aphrodite and the Most High God. Leiden, Netherlands; Boston, United States. ISBN 978-9-004-11231-5.
- Ustinova, Yulia (2005). "Snake-Limbed and Tendril-Limbed Goddesses in the Art and Mythology of the Mediterranean and the Black Sea". In Braund, David (ed.). Scythians and Greeks: Cultural Interaction in Scythia, Athens and the Early Roman Empire (sixth century BC - first century AD). Exeter, United Kingdom: University of Exeter Press. pp. 64–79. ISBN 978-0-859-89746-4.
