= Saulius =

Saulius is a masculine given name.

== Ancient history ==
A Scythian king bore this name:

- Saulius, who reigned in the 6th century BC, brother of Anacharsis and father of Idanthyrsus.

== Lithuania ==
Saulius is also the Lithuanian variant of the Biblical name Saul and an alternative name of Šiauliai.

Lithuanian people named Saulius include:

- Saulius Ambrulevičius (born 1992), Lithuanian figure skater
- Saulius Atmanavičius (born 1970), Lithuanian footballer
- Saulius Binevičius (born 1979), Lithuanian freestyle swimmer
- Saulius Brusokas (born 1968), Lithuanian weightlifter and strongman competitor
- Saulius Kleiza (born 1964), Lithuanian track and field athlete
- Saulius Klevinskas (born 1984), Lithuanian footballer
- Saulius Kulvietis (born 1991), Lithuanian basketball player
- Saulius Kuzminskas (born 1982), Lithuanian basketball player
- Saulius Mikalajūnas (born 1972), Lithuanian international football midfielder
- Saulius Mikoliūnas (born 1984), Lithuanian professional footballer
- Saulius Mykolaitis (1966–2006), Lithuanian director, singer-songwriter, bard, and actor
- Saulius Pakalniškis (1958–2006), Lithuanian zoologist, entomologist, and dipterologist
- Saulius Pečeliūnas (born 1961), Lithuanian politician
- Saulius Ritter (born 1988), Lithuanian rower
- Saulius Ruškys (born 1974), Lithuanian cyclist
- Saulius Šaltenis (born 1945), Lithuanian writer, newspaper editor, and politician
- Saulius Šarkauskas (born 1970), Lithuanian former cyclist
- Saulius Širmelis (born 1956), Lithuanian football coach and former player
- Saulius Skvernelis (born 1970), Lithuanian politician, former Prime Minister of Lithuania
- Saulius Sondeckis (1928–2016), Lithuanian violinist, conductor, orchestra leader, and professor
- Saulius Štombergas (born 1973), Lithuanian basketball player
