= Targitaos =

Mythic founder-king and ancestor of the Scythians

Targī̆tavah
- Other names: Scythes
- Gender: Male
- Region: Eurasian steppe
- Ethnic group: Scythic peoples
- Parents: Papaios and Api
- Consort: Artimpasa and the Snake-Legged Goddess
- Offspring: Lipoxšaya, Arbuxšaya, and Kolaxšaya or Agathyrsos, Gelōnos, Skythēs

Equivalents
- Greek: Hēraklēs

Targitaos or Scythes, was the ancestral god of the Scythians according to Scythian mythology. The ancient Greeks identified him with their own hero Hēraklēs.

== Names ==
=== Targitaos ===
The name Targitaus is the Latinisation of the Greek name Targitaos (Ταργιτάος), which is itself the Hellenised form of the Scythian language name Targī̆tavah, meaning "possessing the strength of the goddess Tarkā."

The name Targitaos was previously explained as being derived from *Dargatavah, meaning “whose might is far-reaching,” which was an untenable etymology because the Iranic sound /d/ had evolved into /δ/ in Proto-Scythian, and later evolved into /l/ in Scythian.

=== Scythes ===
The name Scythes is the Latinisation of the Greek name Skuthēs (Σκυθης), which is itself the Hellenised form of the Scythian language name *Skuδa, which is the endonym of the Scythians.

Due to the sound change from /δ/ to /l/ which had already happened by the 5th century BC, the form *Skula was used by the Scythians by the time that Herodotus of Halicarnassus had recorded the Scythian genealogical myth, as attested by the name of the 5th century BC Scythian king Scyles (Σκυλης), which is the Hellenisation of the Scythian name *Skula.

This means that the Hellenised form Skuthēs had been borrowed at an earlier date, when the form *Skuδa was still used.

=== Sanerges ===
The Sindo-Maeotian form of Targī̆tavah was named Sanerges (Ancient Greek: Σανεργες, romanized: Sanerges; Latin: Sanerges). Reflecting the role of Targī̆tavah in the Scythian genealogical legend, Sanerges was considered the partner of the goddess Aphroditē Apatoura, who was a local iteration of the Snake-Legged Goddess. Like Targī̆tavah, Sanerges was also assimilated with Hēraklēs.

== Identification ==
=== Iranic origin ===
The reference to "Hēraklēs" stealing Gēryōn's cattle after defeating him in Herodotus of Halicarnassus's second version of the Scythian genealogical myth and of his victory against the river-god Araxēs in the Tabula Albana's version were Hellenised versions of an original Scythian myth depicting the typical mythological theme of the fight of the mythical ancestor-hero, that is of Targī̆tavah, against the chthonic forces, through which he slays the incarnations of the primordial chaos to create the Cosmic order.

The reference to "Hēraklēs" driving the cattle of Gēryōn also reflects the motif of the cattle-stealing god widely present among Indo-Iranic peoples, which is also reflected in the legend of Miϑra as a cattle-stealing god. Due to this, the Greek author Herodotus of Halicarnassus identified Targī̆tavah with Hēraklēs in his writings.

=== Hellenic interpretation ===
==== Hēraklēs ====
Targitaos-Scythes was assimilated by the Greeks from the northern shores of the Black Sea with their hero Hēraklēs, and the main feature of this deity identifying him with Hēraklēs was the cattle he drives in the Scythian genealogical myth, although unlike the Greek Hēraklēs who drove the cattle of Gēryōn on foot, the Scythian "Hēraklēs" drove a chariot pulled by mares.

In Greek mythology, Hēraklēs had killed the giant Gēryōn and seized his cows, after which he sailed from Gēryōn's home island of Erytheia to Tartēssos in Iberia, from where he passed by the city of Abdēra and reached Liguria, and then going south to Italy and sailing to Sicily: on the way, he founded several cities and settlements which the Greeks supposedly later "regained." The population of new territories with characters from Greek mythology and history was thus done to justify their acquisition, and therefore the Greeks turned Hēraklēs into a founder of various nations, dynasties, and cities throughout the Oikoumenē from Iberia to India, with these feats being described in several epic Hērakleidēs which were composed and enjoyed popularity within ancient Greek society.

The Hellenisation of the Scythian genealogical myth was, consequently, carried out probably by the Pontic Olbians to further their own interests among the Scythians. Therefore, the addition of Hēraklēs in the Hellenised version of the genealogical myth ascribed to the Scythians a partial Greek ancestry.

The Hellenised myth of "Hēraklēs" staying in Scythia might have been recorded in the Orpheōs Argonautika, which mentions a bull-riding cattle-thief Titan, who might have been Hēraklēs, and who created the Cimmerian Bosporus by cutting a passage from the Maeotian swamp.

==== Achilles ====
Targī̆tavah might also have been a snake-god identified by the Greeks of Pontic Olbia with Achilles Pontarkhēs (lit. 'Achilles, Lord of the Pontic Sea'), in which role he was associated with the Snake-Legged Goddess and was the father of her three sons. The cult of Targī̆tavah in this role might have been reinterpreted by the Greeks into a cult of Achilles.

Unlike the more widespread cult of Hēraklēs, the cult of Achilles Pontarkhēs was limited to the region ranging from the island of Leuke in the west to the island of Borysthenes and the north-west coast of Black Sea to the north of Crimea in the east, and was largely connected to his role as the son of the marine goddess Thetis. This cult might have been connected to Borysthenis, that is the Earth-and-Water goddess Api who was Targī̆tavah's mother.

The cult of Achilles Pontarkhēs very popular in Pontic Olbia, with the large number of dedications to him by priests and archons having been offered at this city suggesting that he enjoyed state cult there.

The popularity of this identification is attested by the presence of scenes depicting the life of Achilles decorating four gorytoi found in the Chortomlyk, Melitopol, Ilintsy, and near Rostov. The Greeks' connection of Achilles with Scythia was so strong that Alcaeus of Mytilene called him the "Lord of Scythia," and the Aithiopis claimed that the tomb of Achilles was located in Scythia, while the Olbians considered Scythia to be the land of Achilles.

== Cult ==
=== Function ===
Targitaos-Scythes was born from the union of the Sky Father Papaios and the Earth-and-Water Mother Api, hence why Herodotus claimed that the Scythians described him as a son of Zeus and of a daughter of the Borysthenes river. Targitaos-Scythes was very closely associated with Papaios or confused with him in Scythian mythology, and he was sometimes replaced by Papaios in some versions of the Scythian genealogical myth, thus attributing the ancestry of the Scythians alternatively to Targitaos-Scythes or to Papaios directly.

According to the various versions of the Scythian genealogical myth, Targī̆tavah fathered the ancestors of the Scythians with the Snake-Legged Goddess.

=== Shrines ===
==== At Hylaea ====
A Greek language inscription from the later 6th century BC recorded the existence of a shrine at which were located altars to:

- the god of the Borysthenes river;
- Targī̆tavah, referred to in the inscription as Hēraklēs;
- the Snake-Legged Goddess, referred to in the inscription as the "Mother of the Gods."

The inscription located this shrine in the wooded region of Hylaea, where, according to the Scythian genealogical myth, was located the residence of the Snake-Legged Goddess, and where she and Targī̆tavah became the ancestors of the Scythians; the deities to whom the altars of the shrine were dedicated to were all present in the Scythian genealogical myth. The altars at the shrine of Hylaea were located in open air, and were not placed within any larger structure or building.

The Olbiopolitan Greeks also worshipped Achilles in his form identified with Targī̆tavah at Hylaea.

==== At Exampaeus ====
Targī̆tavah might possibly have been one of the deities worshipped at the Scythian sacred site of Exampaeus.

==== On the Tyras river ====
A cult to Targī̆tavah might also have been practised on the middle Tyras river, where the various peoples of Scythia, such as the Scythians, the Getic tribes, and the Greek colonists, believed that Targī̆tavah-Hēraklēs had left his footprint.

==== At Leuke ====
The Greek identification of Targī̆tavah with Achilles was connected to a myth already established in archaic times, according to which he was buried on the island of Leuke. The Greek poet Eumelus mentioned Borysthenis, that is the Earth-and-Water goddess Api who was Targī̆tavah's mother, in connection to this myth.

Due to the religious importance of the island of Leuke, spending the night there was forbidden.

==== At Borysthenes ====
Another cult site to Targī̆tavah-Achilles was located at the island of Borysthenes at the entrance of the river of the same name, which was once connected to the promontory of Tendra before flooding turned it into an island in the 5th century BC.

Sailors had to pass through this cult site at the island of Borysthenes to reach Cape Hippolaus, where was located a sacred grove to the Greek goddess Hecate, with whom the Greeks had assimilated the Scythian Snake-Legged Goddess.

=== Iconography ===
Targī̆tavah is the same figure who appears in Scythian art as the masculine figure facing Artimpasa in her depictions as a seated goddess. These scenes depicted the marriage of Targī̆tavah with Artimpasa, but also represented the granting of a promise of afterlife and future resurrection to Targī̆tavah, and, by extension, collectively to his descendants, the Scythians.

Targī̆tavah's role in these scenes also consisted of representing a deified mortal who was identified with him, the Scythian king, who thus was given apotheōsis by identifying him with his divine ancestor. Thus, the scene of the masculine figure facing the seated Artimpasa represented both the goddess's granting of royal power to the king, but also, through the identification with Targī̆tavah, the father of the first Scythian king, the giving of supreme legitimacy to the authority of the royal descendants of Artimpasa in her role as the divine spouse of the Scythian kings.

A representation of Targī̆tavah as investing a king is a scene from a silver rhyton discovered in the Karagodeuashkh Kurgan, depicting two bearded adult mounted horsemen. One of the horsemen holds a rhyton in his right hand and a sceptre in his left hand, while the other horseman has the right hand raised in a gesture of salutation. This scene represented the investiture of a king by a god, and has its parallels in the Iranian world in the Sasanid reliefs of Naqš-e Rostam and Bishapur depicting the investitures of Ardašīr I and of Bahram I by Ahura Mazdā. Although the identity of the figure holding the rhyton has been suggested to be Papaios, it most likely represented Targī̆tavah. In the scene on the rhyton, Targī̆tavah, in his role as the first king and divine ancestor of the Scythians acts as a custodian of the power and the victories of his descendants, and the rhyton he holds represents a communion between the king and the god, paralleling the communion with Artimpasa in the scenes with the seated goddess. The topmost and bottommost parts of the rhyton are decorated with floral patterns, representing the connection between Targī̆tavah and Artimpasa.

== See also ==
- Θraētaona

== Sources ==
- Bäbler, Balbina (2007). "Dio Chrysostom's Construction of Olbia". In Braund, David; Kryzhintskiy, S. D. [in Russian] (eds.). Classical Olbia and the Scythian World: From the Sixth Century BC to the Second Century AD. Oxford, United Kingdom: Oxford University Press. pp. 145–160. ISBN 978-0-197-26404-1.
- Braund, David (2005). "Reflections on Eumelus' Black Sea region". Collection de l'Institut des Sciences et Techniques de l'Antiquité [Collection of the Institute of Sciences and Techniques of Antiquity]. 979: 99–112.
- Braund, David (2007). "Greater Olbia: Ethnic, Religious, Economic, and Political Interactions in the Region of Olbia, c.600–100 BC". In Braund, David; Kryzhintskiy, S. D. [in Russian] (eds.). Classical Olbia and the Scythian World: From the Sixth Century BC to the Second Century AD. Oxford, United Kingdom: Oxford University Press. pp. 33–77. ISBN 978-0-197-26404-1.
- Braund, David (2021). "Heracles' Footprint by the River Tyras: Immortality and Acculturation on the Geto-Scythian Frontier". In Braund, David; Stolba, Vladimir F.; Peter, Ulrike (eds.). Environment and Habitation around the Ancient Black Sea. Berlin, Germany: De Gruyter. pp. 177–194. doi:10.1515/9783110715972-010. ISBN 978-3-110-71570-5.
- Bukharin, Mikhail Dmitrievich [in Russian] (2013). "Колаксай и его братья (античная традиция о происхождении царской власти у скифов" [Kolaxais and his Brothers (Classical Tradition on the Origin of the Royal Power of the Scythians)]. Аристей: вестник классической филологии и античной истории [Aristaeus: Journal of Classical Philology and Ancient History] (in Russian). 3: 20–80.
- Harmatta, János (1996). "10.4.1. The Scythians". In Hermann, Joachim; Zürcher, Erik; Harmatta, János; Litvak, J. K.; Lonis, R. [in French]; Obenga, T.; Thapar, R.; Zhou, Yiliang (eds.). From the Seventh Century B.C. to the Seventh Century A.D. History of Humanity. Vol. 3. London, United Kingdom; New York City, United States; Paris, France: Routledge; UNESCO. ISBN 978-9-231-02812-0.
- Ivantchik, Askold I. (2016). "L'idéologie royale des Scythes et son expression dans la littérature et l'iconographie grecques : l'apport de la numismatique" [The Royal Ideology of the Scythians and its Expression in Greek Literature and Iconography: the Contribution of Numismatics]. Dialogues d'histoire ancienne [Dialogues of Ancient History]. 42 (1): 305–329.
- Ivantchik, Askold (2018). "Scythians". Encyclopædia Iranica. New York City, United States: Encyclopædia Iranica Foundation; Brill Publishers.
- Lincoln, Bruce (2014). "Once again 'the Scythian' myth of origins (Herodotus 4.5–10)". Nordlit. 33 (33): 19–34. doi:10.7557/13.3188.
- Lincoln, Bruce (2018). "Greeks and Scythians in Conversation". Apples and Oranges: Explorations In, On, and With Comparison. Chicago, United States: University of Chicago Press. pp. 84–95. doi:10.7208/9780226564104-009 (inactive 12 July 2025).
- Podossinov, Alexander V. [in Russian] (2022). "Heracles Celticus and Heracles Scythicus: the Same Narrative in the West and East of Europe?". In Boardman, J.; Hargrave, J.; Avram, A.; Podossinov, A. [in Russian] (eds.). Connecting the Ancient West and East: Studies Presented to Prof. Gocha R. Tsetskhladze. Leuven, Belgium: Peeters Publishers. pp. 1291–1306. ISBN 978-9-042-94414-5.
- Raevskiy, Dmitriy [in Russian] (1993). Marazov, Ivan (ed.). Scythian Mythology. Sofia, Bulgaria: Secor Publishers. ISBN 978-9-548-25002-3.
- Redondo, Jordi (2022). "The Herodotean Myth on the Origin of the Scythians". In Christopoulos, Menelaos; Papachrysostomou, Athina; Antonopoulos, Andreas P. (eds.). Myth and History: Close Encounters. Berlin, Germany; Boston, United States: Walter de Gruyter GmbH. pp. 167–186. doi:10.1515/9783110780116-011. ISBN 978-3-110-77958-5.
- Safaee, Yazdan (2020). "Scythian and Zoroastrian Earth Goddesses: A Comparative Study on Api and Ārmaiti". In Niknami, Kamal-Aldin; Hozhabri, Ali (eds.). Archaeology of Iran in the Historical Period. University of Tehran Science and Humanities Series. Springer International Publishing. pp. 65–75. doi:10.1007/978-3-030-41776-5_6. ISBN 978-3-030-41776-5. S2CID 219515548.
- Schmitt, Rüdiger (2003). "Die skythischen Personennamen bei Herodot" [Scythian Personal Names in Herodotus] (PDF). Annali dell'Università degli Studi di Napoli l'Orientale [Annals of the University of Naples "L'Orientale"] (in German). 63: 1–31.
- Rusyayeva, A. S. [in Ukrainian] (2007). "Religious Interactions between Olbia and Scythia". In Braund, David; Kryzhintskiy, S. D. [in Russian] (eds.). Classical Olbia and the Scythian World: From the Sixth Century BC to the Second Century AD. Oxford, United Kingdom: Oxford University Press. pp. 93–102. ISBN 978-0-197-26404-1.
- Szemerényi, Oswald (1980). Four old Iranian ethnic names: Scythian – Skudra – Sogdian – Saka (PDF). Vienna, Austria: Verlag der Österreichischen Akademie der Wissenschaften. ISBN 978-3-700-10367-7.
- Tokhtasyev, Sergey [in Russian] (2013). "Из ономастики Северного Причерноморья. XXI. Τράκανα" [On Onomastics of the Northern Black Sea region. XXI. Τράκανα]. Вестник древней истории [Journal of Ancient History]. 281 (1): 193–196.
- Ustinova, Yulia (1999). The Supreme Gods of the Bosporan Kingdom: Celestial Aphrodite and the Most High God. Leiden, Netherlands; Boston, United States: Brill Publishers. ISBN 978-9-004-11231-5.
- Vitchak, K. T. (1999). "Скифский язык: опыт описания" [The Scythian Language: Attempt at Description]. Вопросы языкознания. 5: 50–59.
