= Orgia =

Cult ceremony of Dionysos

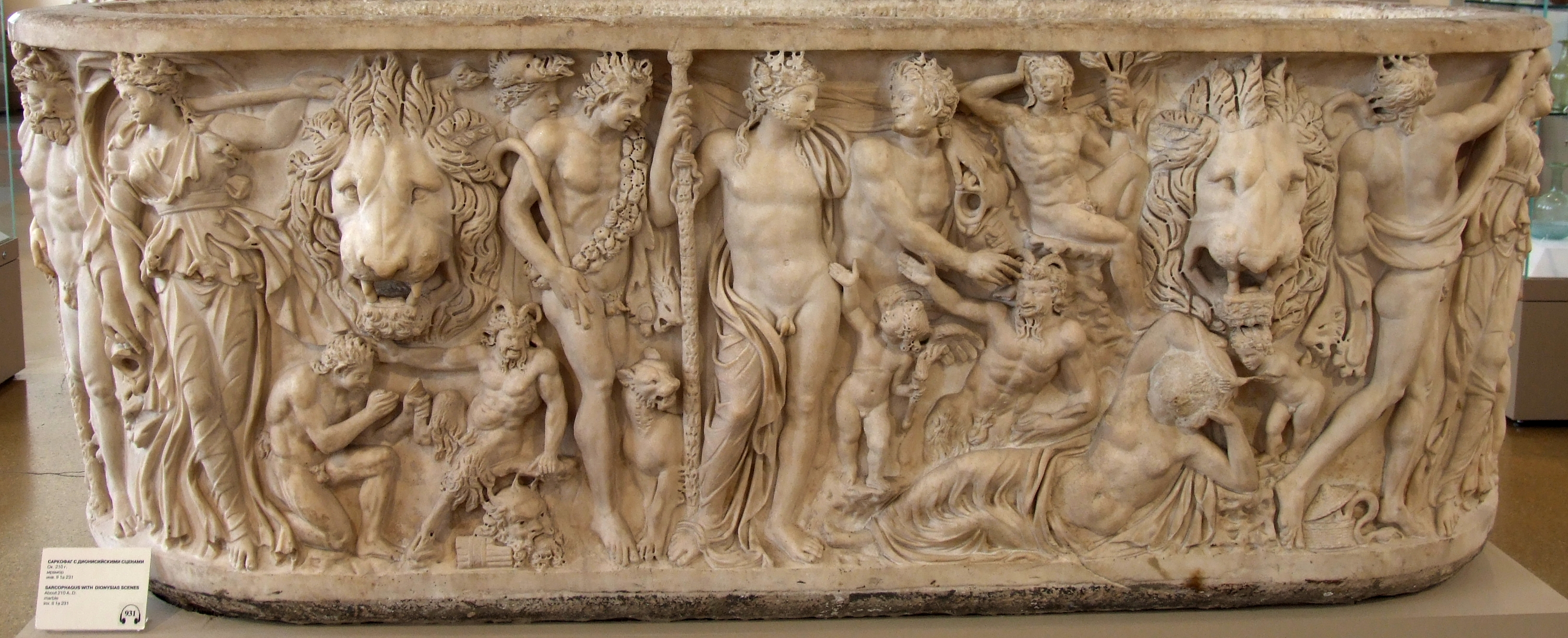
Dionysian scene on a 3rd-century AD sarcophagus

In ancient Greek religion, an orgion (ὄργιον, more commonly in the plural orgia) was an ecstatic form of worship characteristic of some mystery cults. The orgion is in particular a cult ceremony of Dionysos (or Zagreus), celebrated widely in Arcadia, featuring "unrestrained" masked dances by torchlight and animal sacrifice by means of random slashing that evoked the god's own rending and suffering at the hands of the Titans. The orgia that explained the role of the Titans in Dionysos's dismemberment were said to have been composed by Onomacritus. Greek art and literature, as well as some patristic texts, indicate that the orgia involved snake handling.

== Summary ==
Orgia may have been earlier manifestations of cult than the formal mysteries, as suggested by the violently ecstatic rites described in myth as celebrated by Attis in honor of Cybele and reflected in the willing self-castration of her priests the Galli in the historical period. The orgia of both Dionysian worship and the cult of Cybele aim at breaking down barriers between the celebrants and the divinity through a state of mystic exaltation:

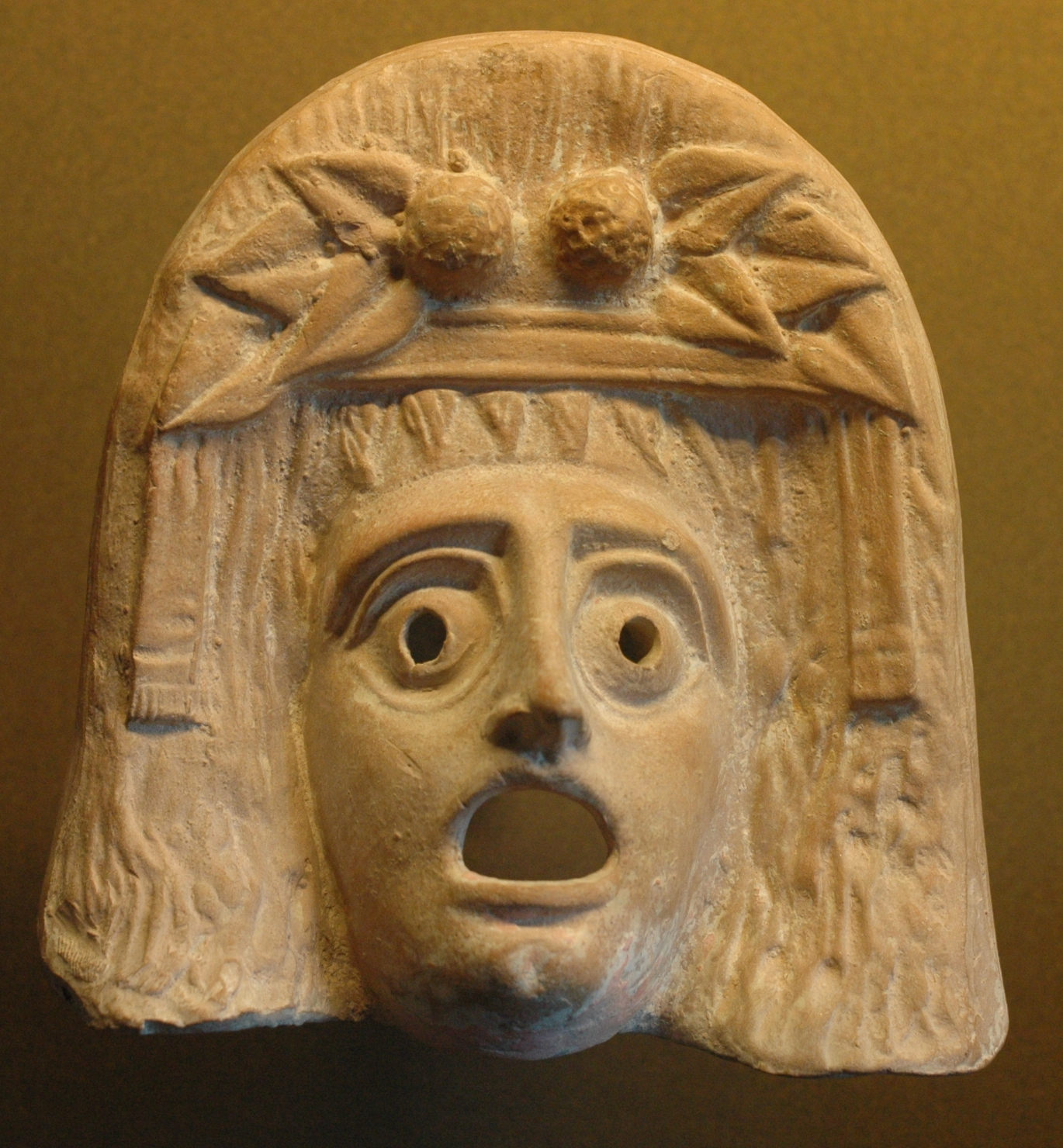
Dionysian mask

Dionysian orgy allowed the Bacchant to emerge from the 'ego' to be united with the god in the ecstatic exaltation of omophagia, dancing and wine. … This kind of bodily mysticism and psychosomatic liberation had only temporary effects each time—the period of the ekstasis.

Initiates of the Orphic and Bacchic orgia practiced distinctive burial customs (see Totenpass) expressive of their beliefs in an afterlife; for instance, it was forbidden for the dead to wear wool.

Members of a group devoted to performing orgia are called orgeônes, whose activities were regulated by law. The cult of the Thracian goddess Bendis was organized at Athens by her orgeônes as early as the Archaic period.

The participation of women in orgia, which in some manifestations was exclusive to women, sometimes led to prurient speculation and attempts to suppress the rites. In 186 BC, the Roman senate tried to ban Dionysian religion as subversive both morally and politically.

Isidore of Seville says that the Latin equivalent of orgia was caerimoniae (English "ceremonies"), the arcane rites of ancient Roman religion preserved by the various colleges of priests.

== See also ==
- Bacchanalia
- Cult of Dionysus
- Thiasos
