= Scythian religion =

Beliefs of the Scythian cultures

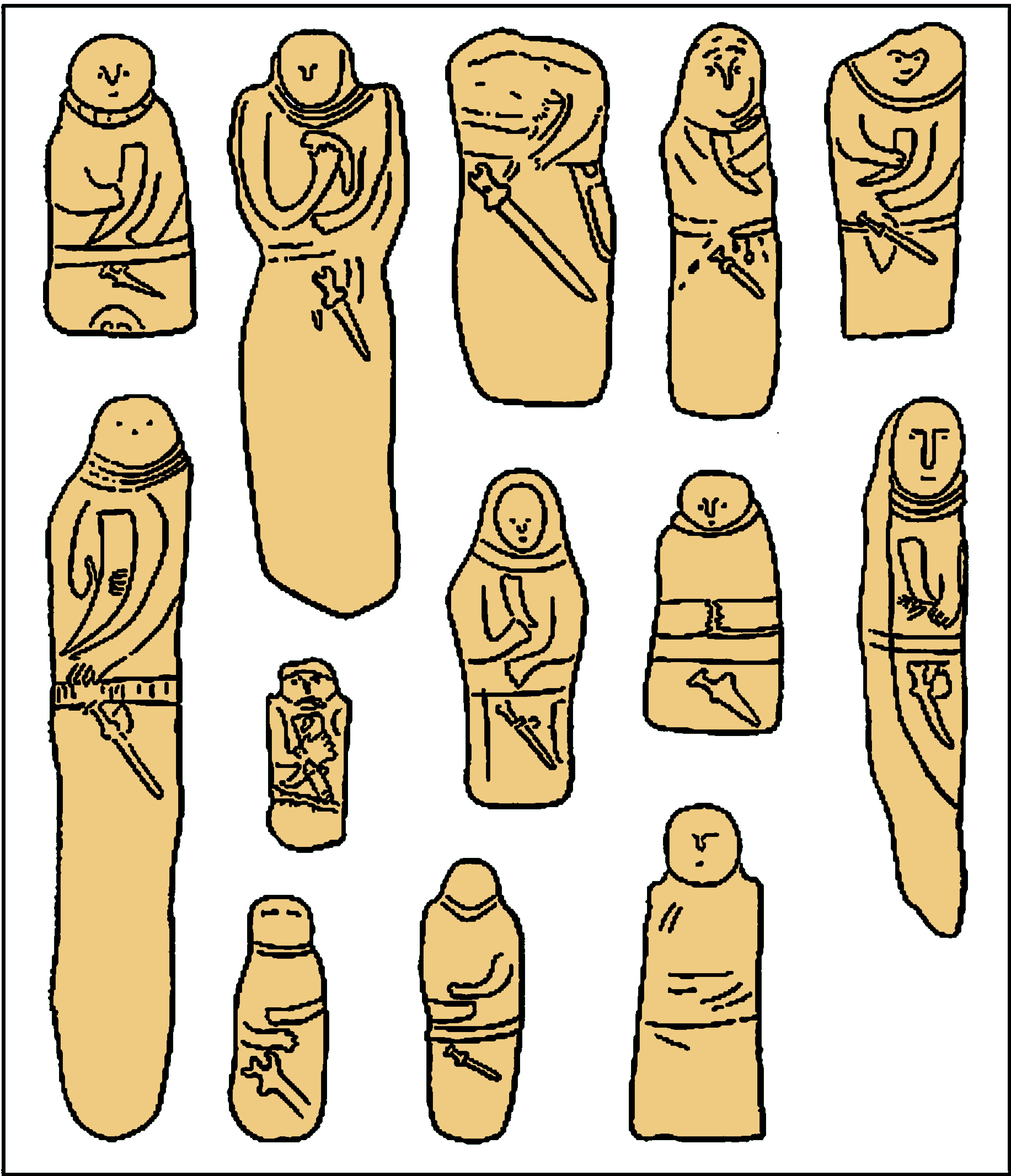
A collection of drawings of Scythian stelae of the 6th and 5th centuries BC. Many of them depict warriors, apparently representing the deceased buried in the kurgan, holding a drinking horn in their right hand.

The Scythian religion refers to the mythology, ritual practices and beliefs of the Scythian cultures, a collection of closely related ancient Iranic peoples who inhabited Central Asia and the Pontic–Caspian steppe in Eastern Europe throughout Classical Antiquity, spoke the Scythian language (itself a member of the Eastern Iranic language family), and which included the Scythians proper, the Cimmerians, the Sarmatians, the Alans, the Sindi, the Massagetae and the Saka.

The Scythian religion is assumed to have been related to the earlier Proto-Indo-Iranian religion as well as to contemporary Eastern Iranic and Ossetian traditions, and to have influenced later Slavic, Hungarian and Turkic mythologies.

== Development ==
The Scythian religion was of Iranic origin, and was influenced by that of the populations whom the Scythians had conquered, such as the sedentary Thracian populations of the western Pontic steppe. Due to this, many of the Scythian male deities had equivalents in the pantheon of the Thracian peoples, including those living in Anatolia, and some of the names of these deities were of Thracian origin; the Scythian female deities, and especially their links with special cults and their rites and symbols, were also connected to Thracian and Anatolian culture.

During the Scythians' stay in Western Asia, their religion had also been influenced by ancient Mesopotamian and Canaanite religions.

== Cosmology ==
The Scythian cosmology corresponded to the typically Indo-Iranic tripartite structure of the universe , which is also present in the Vedic and Avestan traditions, and according to which the universe was composed of:

- the celestial realm
- the air space
- earthly realm and the underworld

== Pantheon ==
According to Herodotus of Halicarnassus, the Scythians worshipped a pantheon of seven gods and goddesses (heptad), which he equates with Greek divinities of Classical Antiquity following the interpretatio graeca. He mentioned eight deities divided into three ranks, with this structure of the Scythian pantheon being typically Indo-Iranic:

Family tree of the Scythian gods

Tabiti; Scythian: Tapatī	Borysthenes; Scythian: Baurastāna or Baurustāna
Papaios; Scythian: Pāpayah	Api; Scythian: Api	Araxes
Artimpasa	Targitaos; Scythian: Targī̆tavah	Snake-Legged Goddess
Lipoxais; Scythian: Lipoxšayah	Arpoxais; Scythian: R̥buxšayah	Kolaxais; Scythian: Kolaxšayah
Three sons

1. In the first rank was the head of the pantheon:
  - Tabiti, the Flaming One, who was the goddess of heat, fire and the hearth
2. In the second rank were the binary opposites and the father and mother of the universe:
  - Api, the Earth and Water Mother
  - Papaios, the Sky Father
3. The third and final rank was composed of four deities with specific characteristics:
  - Targitaos, the forefather of the Scythian kings
  - The Scythian "Ares," the god of war
  - Goitosyros, who might have been associated with the Sun
  - Artimpasa, a more complex goddess who was a patron of fertility and had power over sovereignty and the priestly force

- An eighth Scythian deity mentioned by Herodotus was Thagimasadas, who was worshipped only by the tribe of the Royal Scythians.

This list of the Scythian deities by Herodotus might have been a translation of a Scythian hymn to the gods which was chanted during sacrifices and rituals.

With the omission of Thagimasadas who was worshipped only by the Royal Scythians, the Scythian pantheon was composed of seven gods, with the Sarmatian tribe of the Alans also being attested as worshipping seven deities, and traces of a similar tradition being recorded among Ossetians. This heptatheism was a typical feature of Indo-Iranic religions: seven Aməša Spəṇta led by Ahura Mazdā are worshipped in the Zoroastrian religion of the more southern Iranic peoples, which had significantly transformed the concepts of the Indo-Iranic religion while also inheriting several features of it; the leading deities of the Indic Vedic pantheon, the Āditya, were also seven in number.

This pantheon was a reflection of the Scythian cosmology, headed by the primeval fire which was the basic essence and the source of all creation, following which came the Earth-Mother and Sky-Father who created the gods, the latter of whom were the four custodians of the four sides of the world regulating the universe. The world inhabited by humans existed between this celestial realm and the chthonic realm below the earth.

=== The first rank ===
==== Tabiti ====
The Scythian name of the goddess Tabiti (Ancient Greek: Ταβιτί) was *Tapatī, which meant "the Burning One" or "the Flaming One," was the goddess of the primordial fire which alone existed before the creation of the universe and was the basic essence and the source of all creation, and from her were born Api (the Earth) and Papaeus (Heaven).

Tabiti the most venerated of all Scythian deities, is associated with Indo-Iranic concept of fire. She was not, however, depicted in Scythian art, and was instead represented by the fireplace, which constituted the sacral centre of any community, from the family to the tribe.

As a goddess of the hearth, Tabiti was the patron of society, the state, and families, and she thus protected the family and the clan, and was a symbol of supreme authority. The king's hearth was hence connected with Tabiti, and Tabiti herself was connected with royal power.

The "hearths" (Ancient Greek: ἑστίαι, romanized: hestíai) of Tabiti were likely the flaming gold objects which fell from the sky in the Scythian genealogical myth and of which the king was the trustee while Tabiti herself in turn was the protector of the king and the royal hearth.

=== The second rank ===
==== Api ====
The Scythian goddess of the birth-giving chthonic principle was Api (Ancient Greek: Ἀπί, romanized: Api; Latin: Api) or Apia (Hellenised as Ancient Greek: Ἀπία, romanized: Apia; Latin: Apia). This goddess's role is reflected by her name, *Api, which was a Scythian cognate of the Avestan word for water, api (𐬀𐬞𐬌), and through her equation by Herodotus of Halicarnassus with the Greek goddess of the Earth, Gaia. Api was the daughter of the god Borysthenēs, due to which she was also called Borysthenis (Ancient Greek: Βορυσθενίς).

The identification of Api as a goddess of both Earth and water rested upon the conceptualisation in ancient cosmologies of Earth and water as being two aspects of the same birth-giving chthonic principle; and, within Iranic tradition, the earth was a life-giving principle which was inextricably connected to water, which was itself held to have fertilising, nourishing, and healing properties. The name Api was also linked to a child-talk endearing word meaning "mommy," with these various connections of Api and her name painting the consistent picture of her as a primordial deity from whom was born the world's first inhabitants.

Api was connected to the Avestan water goddess Arəduuī Sūrā Anāhitā, one of whose epithets was āp (Avestan: 𐬁𐬞, lit. 'water'); the name of Api's father, the aquatic god Borysthenēs, might have meant "place of beavers," thus possibly connecting him to the mantle of beaver skins worn by the latter goddess in Avestan scripture, and in turn establishing another connection between Api and Arəduuī Sūrā Anāhitā. Being a goddess of water and earth, Api was also similar to the Zoroastrian Amesha Spenta—divine entity—Armaiti.

Api was the consort of Papaios, with the two of them initially existing together into an inseparable unity and their union representing the joining of opposite principles such as above and below, male and female, warmth and moisture, and therefore reflecting the Indo-Iranic tradition of the marriage between Heaven and Earth as the basis for the creation of the world, - and paralleling the union between Ahurā Mazdā and the Ameshaspand Armaiti (who takes care of Earth) in the Avesta.

The union of Api and Papaios gave birth to the "middle world," that is the air space, which is the part of the cosmos where humanity and all physical beings lived. From the union of Api and Papaios were also born the gods of the third rank of the Scythian pantheon, who were associated with the "middle world." The completion of this process of cosmogenesis created an ordered universe made up of three zones - a cosmic one, a central one, and a chthonic one - located each above the other.

As a primordial goddess who gave birth to the first inhabitants of the world, Api remained aloof from worldly affairs and did not interfere with them after the creation of the world and the establishment of the proper order.

The worship of Api by Scythian peoples is attested in Strabo's mention that the Derbices worshipped "Mother Earth."

==== Papaeus ====
The Scythian personification of Heaven and equivalent of the Zoroastrian great god Ahura Mazdā (𐬨𐬀𐬰𐬛𐬁 𐬀𐬵𐬎𐬭𐬀) was the god Papaeus (Ancient Greek: Παπαῖος, romanized: Papaîos), who, like Ahura Mazdā, was also a divine father. This is reflected in the original Scythian name of this god, which was *Pāpaya, meaning "father." Papaios was the consort of the Earth goddess Api, hence why he was equated by Herodotus of Halicarnassus with the Greek god Zeus.

Papaios was the son of Tabiti, the primordial fire. Papaios and Api initially existed together into an inseparable unity, with their union representing the joining of opposite principles such as above and below, male and female, warmth and moisture, and therefore reflecting the Indo-Iranic tradition of the marriage between Heaven and Earth as the basis for the creation of the world, - and paralleling the union between Ahurā Mazdā and the Earth goddess Armaiti in the Avesta.

The union of Papaios and Api gave birth to the "middle world," that is the air space, which is the part of the cosmos where humanity and all physical beings lived. From the union of Api and Papaios were also born the gods of the third rank of the Scythian pantheon, who were associated with the "middle world." The completion of this process of cosmogenesis created an ordered universe made up of three zones - a cosmic one, a central one, and a chthonic one - located each above the other.

According to Origen of Alexandria, the Scythians considered Papaeus to be a supreme god, hence why the ancient Greeks were able to identify him with their own god Zeus, who was conceptualised as a cosmic force who ruled over and was the father of all peoples and gods throughout the world, including in Scythia.

The scholar Yazdan Safaee argues that Darius the Great's statement in the Behistun Inscription that the Scythians did not worship Ahura Mazdā thus had no basis and was a political statement resulting from the hostilities between the Persian Empire and the Scythians.

=== The third rank ===
The deities of the third rank of the Scythian pantheon were associated to the "middle world" inhabited by humans and physical living beings, and which the Scythian cosmology, like all ancient cosmologies, conceptualised as a square plane with four sides each corresponding to one of the radical coordinates as a structural aspect of space. Each side of this quadrangular earthly plane had a symbol, and was thus associated to one of the four deities of the third rank, who were the collective personification of the four-sided "middle world," with a similar concept being found in Indic mythology in the form of the Lokapāla, the four guardian-gods of the directions, who each also had their own "sphere of action," such as Yama, the guardian of the South, being the ruler over the world of the deceased ancestors, and Indra, the guardian of the East, being the king of the gods and the personification of the "middle world."

==== Targitaos ====
The Scythian god Targī̆tavah (meaning "possessing the strength of the goddess Tarkā"; Ancient Greek: Ταργιτάος, romanized: Targitáos) or Skuδa (Ancient Greek: Σκύθης, romanized: Skúthēs; Latin: Scythes), appears in the Greek recollections of Scythian genealogical myth where he was called the "Scythian Hēraklēs" by Herodotus of Halicarnassus, although he was not the same as the Greek hero Heracles. Targī̆tavah-Skuδa was born from the union of Papaeus and Api, and he was the divine ancestor of the Scythians.

Targī̆tavah might also have been identified by the Greeks in southern Scythia with Achilles Pontarkhēs (lit. 'Achilles, Lord of the Pontic Sea'), in which role he was associated with the Snake-Legged Goddess and was the father of her three sons.

==== The Scythian "Ares" ====
The Scythian "Ares," that is the Scythian war god equated by Herodotus with the Greek god Ares, corresponded to the Iranic deity Vər^{ə}ϑraγna, and might possibly have been an offspring of Tabiti. The Scythian "Ares" was also a god of kingship, and the use of horses and of the blood and right arms of prisoners in his cult was a symbolic devotion of the swiftness of horses and the strength of men to this god who had similar powers.

The Scythian and Sarmatian "Ares" was represented by an akīnakēs sword planted upwards at the top of a tall square altar made of brushwood of which three sides were vertical and the fourth was inclined to allow access to it. The Scythian "Ares" was given blood sacrifices and his representation in the form of a sword are evidence of his military function.

The tallness of the mound which acted as the altar to the Scythian "Ares," as well as the practice of throwing the right arms of prisoners sacrificed to him in the sky, are evidence of the celestial nature of the Scythian "Ares" as a god of the air space, that is the practice of throwing these sacrificed arms in the air indicate that the Scythian "Ares" was associated to the gods of the sky and wind, Vāta (𐬬𐬁𐬙𐬀) and Vāiiu (𐬬𐬁𐬌𐬌𐬎), and more especially the wind, since the wind-god Vāiiu was the first incarnation of Vər^{ə}ϑraγna and a special carrier of fārnā/x^{v}ar^{ə}nah. This is also recorded in the works of the Greek author Lucian of Samosata, who recorded that the Scythians worshipped the Wind and the Sword as gods, referring to the dual nature of the Scythian "Ares" as a god of both the Wind, which brings gives life, and the Sword, which brings death; the dual nature of this god is also visible in the akīnakēs used to represent him being shaped like a phallus, thus being a deadly weapon which was also shaped in the form of a life-giving organ.

The Thracian neighbours of the Scythians also represented their war god with an iron sword and offered him bloody sacrificed and wine libations, although it is unknown whether the Thracians adopted this custom from the Scythians or vice versa.

The Sarmatians similarly represented their "Ares" in the form of a sword planted upright, and, according to Tadeusz Sulimirski, this form of worship continued among the descendants of the Sarmatians, the Alans, through to the 4th century AD; this tradition may be reflected in Jordanes's assertion that Attila had obtained the sacred Scythian sword which had fallen from the sky that he called the "Sword of Mars," and which he believed made him powerful in war and made of him the "prince of the entire world."

===== Legacy =====
The hero Batraz from the Ossetian Nart saga might have originated from the Scythian "Ares." In the sagas, Batraz appears as a brave but uncontrolled warrior living in the air space and sometimes took the form of a whirlwind, who often protected his peoples from multiple enemies. He was made of steel and connected to his sword, which provided him with immortality so long as it remained unbroken, thus being the incarnation of Batraz himself.

==== Goitosyros ====
The Scythian god Gaiϑāsūra (Ancient Greek: Γοιτόσυρος, romanized: Goitósuros; Latin: Goetosyrus), might have been a solar deity, due to which Herodotus equated him with the Greek god Apollo. Gaiϑāsūra may have been closely associated to the goddess Artimpasa.

The Scythian name Gaiϑāsūra is comparable to Avestan Gaoiiao^{i}tiš.sūrō (𐬔𐬀𐬊𐬌𐬌𐬀𐬊𐬌𐬙𐬌𐬱⸱𐬯𐬏𐬭𐬋) and Vedic Sanskrit Gavyutiśūra (गव्युतिशूर), with the Avestan form being an epithet of Miϑra as the "Lord of Cattle-Land," that is a deity of cattle culture widely worshipped by the common people in Scythian society. The first term composing this name, gaiϑā, meaning "herd" and "possessions," is a cognate of Avestan gaoiiao^{i}tiš (𐬔𐬀𐬊𐬌𐬌𐬀𐬊𐬌𐬙𐬌𐬱), meaning "cow pasture," and reflects the nature of "Apollo Goetosyrus" as a Hellenization of the Iranic deity Mithra Vo^{u}ru.gaoiiao^{i}tiš (𐬬𐬊𐬎𐬭𐬎⸱𐬔𐬀𐬊𐬌𐬌𐬀𐬊𐬌𐬙𐬌𐬱); the second element sūra, meaning "strong" and "mighty," is the same as the Avestan element sūra, meaning "mighty," from the name of the goddess Arəduuī Sūrā Anāhitā (𐬀𐬭𐬆𐬛𐬎𐬎𐬍⸱𐬯𐬏𐬭𐬁⸱𐬀𐬥𐬁𐬵𐬌𐬙𐬀), and is connected to the Scythians' association of Gaiϑāsūra with the goddess Artimpasa, who had absorbed many of the traits of Arəduuī Sūrā Anāhitā.

Due to the connections of Gaiϑāsūra's and his identification with the Greek god Apollo, he has been identified with Miϑra, although this identification is largely tentative, with the multiple functions of Apollo contributing to this uncertainty.

Depictions of a solar god with a radiate head and riding a carriage pulled by two or four horses on numerous pieces of art found in Scythian burials from the 3rd century BC and later might have been representations of Gaiϑāsūra.

An alternative orthography for the Hellenised name of this god was Oitosyros (Ancient Greek: Οἰτόσυρος; Latin: Oetosyrus), which has led to an alternative etymology in the form of Vaitāsūra, meaning "might of the willow," which would connect him with the Scythian practice of divination using willow rods.

==== Artimpasa ====
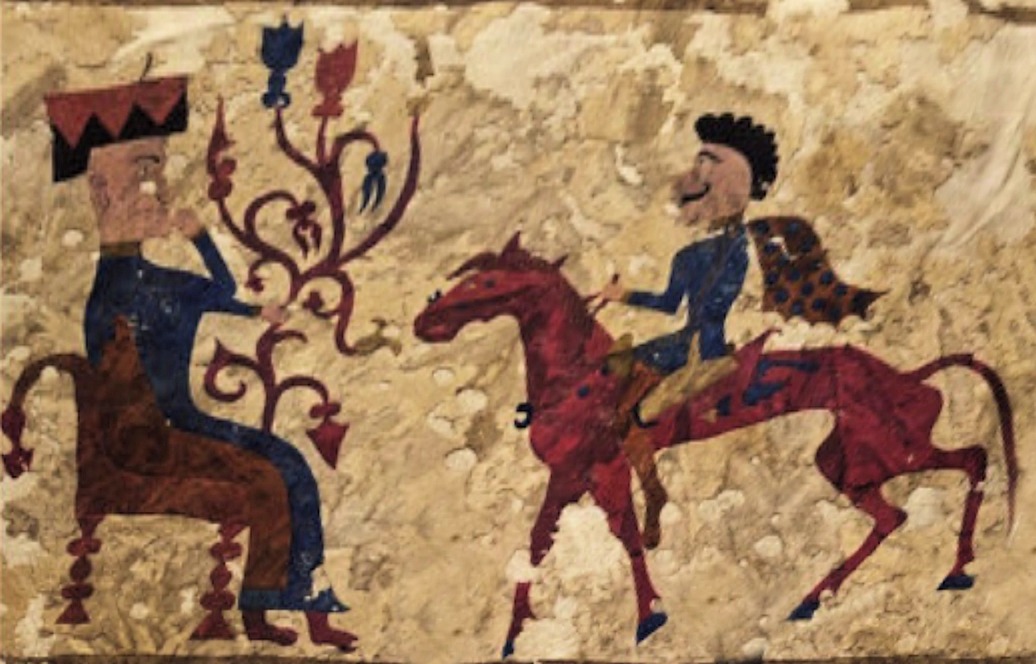
Decorated tapestry with a seated goddess (Artimpasa) and Scythian rider, Pazyryk Kurgan 5, Altai, Southern Russia c. 241 BC.

Artimpasa (Ancient Greek: Ἀρτίμπασα, romanized: Artímpasa; Latin: Artimpasa), often erroneously called Argimpasa (Ancient Greek: Ancient Greek: Ἀργίμπασα, romanized: Argímpasa) due to a scribal corruption, was a complex androgynous Scythian goddess of fertility who possessed power over sovereignty and the priestly force.

Artimpasa was a goddess of warfare, sovereignty, priestly force, fecundity, vegetation and fertility, and was the Scythian variant of the Iranic goddess Arti (𐬀𐬭𐬙𐬌)/Aṣ̌i (𐬀𐬴𐬌), who was a patron of fertility and marriage and a guardian of laws who represented material wealth in its various forms, including domestic animals, precious objects, and a plentiful descendance. Artimpasa had also been influenced by the Iranic goddess Anāhitā, the Assyro-Babylonian Ištar-ʿAštart, and by the Thracian Great Mother goddess Bendis, thus making her an altogether complex deity.

Artimpasa was thus equated by Herodotus with the Greek goddess Aphrodite Urania, who herself presided over productivity in the material world.

==== Thagimasidas ====
Thagimasadas (Ancient Greek: Θαγιμασάδας, romanized: Thagimasádas) or Thamimasidas (Ancient Greek: Θαμιμασάδας, romanized: Thamimasádas) was a god worshipped only by the tribe of the Royal Scythians. Thagimasadas was thus not a member of the pan-Scythian heptatheistic pantheon and was likely the tribal- and ancestor- deity of the Royal Scythians.

The etymology of the name of this deity is uncertain, and element -μασάδας of the god's name might be derived from the Iranic term mazatā, meaning "great"; the element Θαγι- might have been a cognate of the Avestan word ϑβāṣ̌a (𐬚𐬡𐬁𐬴𐬀, meaning "firmament"), and the Vedic Sanskrit term tvakṣ- (त्वक्ष्) or takṣ- (तक्ष्), meaning "to create by putting into motion."

Herodotus identified Thagimasadas with the Greek god Poseidon because both Thagimasadas and Poseidon (in his form as Poseidon Hippius, lit. 'the equine Poseidōn') were horse-tamer deities, but also because, among the Athenians who were his audience, Poseidon was identified with Erichthonius of Athens, whom the Athenians considered their mythical ancestor, similarly to how Thagimasadas was believed to be the ancestor of the Royal Scythians.

The equation of Thagimasadas with Poseidon might also be due to his possible role as a fashioner of the sky and hence was connected to sky-waters and thunderbolts just like the Greek Poseidon was. Alternatively, Thagimasadas might have been a god of the rivers of Scythia, which played an important role in the lives of the Scythians.

The Scythian images of a winged horse inspired from that of the Greek Pegasus might have been connected to Thagimasadas.

=== Other deities ===
==== The Snake-Legged Goddess ====
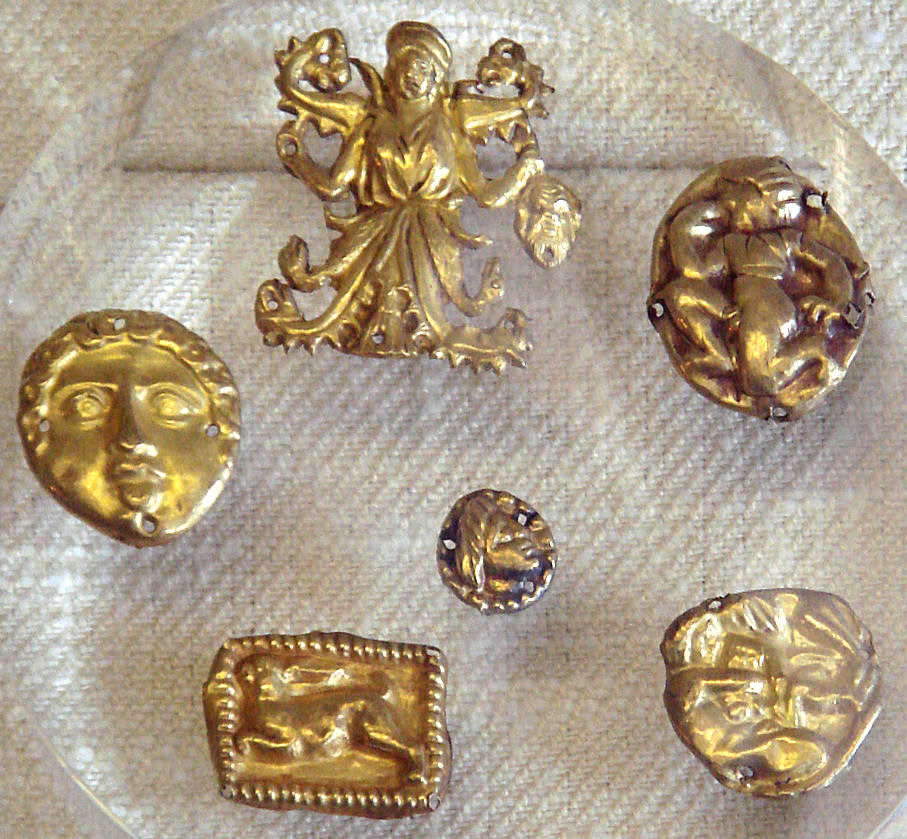
The Snake-Legged Goddess (top)

The Scythian deity known in modern-day as the "Snake-Legged Goddess," also referred to as the "Anguipede Goddess," so called because several representations of her depict her as a goddess with snakes or tendrils as legs, was associated to the life-giving principle. The Snake-Legged Goddess was a daughter of Api, likely through a river-god, and belonged to a younger generation of deities of "lower status" who were more actively involved in human life.

She appears in all variations of the Scythian genealogical myth as the Scythian fore-mother who sires the ancestor and first king of the Scythians with Targī̆tavah, and her representations in art with a beard suggests that she was an androgynous goddess just like the goddess Artimpasa to whom she was affiliated.

The Greeks of Pontic Olbia often identified the Snake-Legged Goddess with their own goddesses Cybele, Demeter and Hecate. Representations of Demeter and her daughter Persephone on Greek-manufactured Scythian decorative plates might have been connected to this identification of the Snake-Legged Goddess with Demeter.

==== The Divine Twins ====
The mytheme of the Divine twins, which appears across several Indo-European religions in the form of the Ancient Greek Dioskouroi, the Vedic Aśvins and the twins from the Dacian tablets - these divine twins had in earlier Indo-European mythology been horses before later evolving into horsemen such as the Aśvins and the English Hengist and Horsa, who had horse-names. In Indo-European mythology, the divine twins were companions of the Mother-Goddess who flanked her symbol of the Tree of Life, especially in depictions of them as two horses or horsemen who stand symmetrically near a goddess or a tree.

In pre-Zoroastrian Iranic religion, Nåŋha^{i}ϑiia (𐬥𐬂𐬢𐬵𐬀𐬌𐬚𐬌𐬌𐬀), the Iranic inflection of the divine twins, were connected with Anāhitā and were her companions. The cult of the divine twins existed among the Scythians, with Lucian of Samosata recording the veneration of two twin deities in a Scythian temple whom he identified with the Greek Orestes and Pylades. Their duality represented the contrast of death against fertility and resurrection, and were related to royalty and warrior society, which thus made them companions of Artimpasa, as depicted in the Karagodeuashkh plate.

Depictions of the divine twins among Scythian peoples included some Sarmatian royal brands depicting the theme of the two horsemen standing symmetrically near a tree, a small figure from a Scythian burial at Krasny Mayak depicting two men embracing one another, as well as two Greek-made bronze figurines from Scythian Neapolis depicting the Greek Dioscuri who were identified by the Scythians with the divine twins, together with a terracotta sculpture in the shape of a goddess's head were discovered in an ash altar near a wall of a temple where was worshipped a fertility goddess to whom was associated images of rams.

The divine twins' position in Scythian religion was inferior to that of the gods, likely belonging to the rank of heroes, and might possibly have been the same as the two brothers and first Scythian kings born of Targī̆tavah and the Snake-Legged Goddess in the genealogical myth. The Scythian divine twins, who were most likely the origin of the twin heroes who appear in the Ossetian Nart saga, are another reflection of the Indo-European mytheme of the divine twins as the progenitors of royal dynasties, also found in the Roman myth of Romulus and Remus, the English Hengist and Horsa, and the Greek Dioskouroi as the originators of the dual-monarchy of Sparta.

==== Borysthenēs ====
The river Borysthenēs (Ancient Greek: Βορυσθένης presently the Dnipro) was worshipped by the Scythians as a god. Borysthenēs was the father of the Earth-and-Water goddess, Api. although this role of his as the father of the primordial Earth-and-Water Mother suggests that he was not a mere river deity.

The name Borysthenēs was derived from a Scythian original Scythian form which was:

- either Baurastāna, meaning "yellow place,"
- or Baurustāna meant "place of beavers."
  - this name was linked to the mantle of beaver skins worn by the Iranic water goddess Arəduuī Sūrā Anāhitā, whose epithet of āp (Avestan: 𐬁𐬞, lit. 'water') was connected to the name of the god Borysthenēs's daughter, the Earth-and-Water goddess Api, whose own name meant "water."

The god Borysthenēs was depicted on coins of Pontic Olbia under the traits of a typical bearded Greek river god with horns on his head.

==== Tarkā ====
The goddess Tarkā or Targā was worshipped during the later Scythian period at a shrine located on the Tarkhankut Peninsula in Crimea, at Canğul, which in ancient times was called *Tarkāna (Ancient Greek: Τράκανα, romanized: Trákana) after the goddess.

The name of the goddess Tarkā might be derived from the Iranic root tark-, meaning "to turn."

==== Dithagoia ====
The goddess Dithagoia (Ancient Greek: Διθαγοια) was mentioned in a Greek language dedication by the Crimean princess Senamōtis in the 2nd century BC.

Dithagoia might have been a chthonic goddess who was identified with the Greek goddesses Artemis and Hecate. This goddess might be connected to the "Scythian Artemis" whose existence is recorded by the later Graeco-Roman authors Philostratus and Apollonius of Tyana.

==== The Solar Horseman ====
Among the Scythians and the Sindo-Maeotians was present the cult of a solar god depicted as a mounted deified ancestor. This deity was believed to be a fighter against evil, and was popular from the late first millennium BC to the first centuries of the Common Era on the Black Sea coast, Central Asia and Transcaucasia, and appeared in South Asia following the migrations of the Saka there.

==== The Mounted God of the Bosporus ====
By the 1st centuries AD in the Bosporus, the chariot-riding Scythian solar god Gaiϑāsūra had been syncretised with the horse-riding Persian god Mithra, imported from the southern and eastern shores of the Pontus Euxinus, to become the Most High God (Ancient Greek: Θεός Ύψιστος, romanized: Theós Úpsistos) of the Bosporan Kingdom. This Most High God, who was depicted as a horseman, enjoyed wide popularity and was raised to the status of divine patron of the royal dynasty.

The Most High God was known in Tanais as Pharnouchos derived from Old Iranic fārnā-, which reflects his nature as a grace- and power-giving solar god.

A stele from 104 AD which commemorates the celebration of the Day of Tanais depicts the Most High God as a mounted horseman dressed in Sarmatian costume and holding a rhyton in his right hand, with a blazing altar in front of him and a tree behind the altar. This scene is consistent with the depictions of the horsemen facing Artimpasa in Scythian art, and represents the communion of the Most High God with the Bosporan Aphrodite Urania evolved from Artimpasa, and is represented by the tree (similarly to Artimpasa, the Bosporan Aphrodite Urania was sometimes represented with tree-shaped limbs or head, with her palm shaped like large leaves on stele, and her head shaped like a tree top and her hands shaped like branches on a stamp), while the altar sanctifies the ceremony.

==== Unattested deities ====
In addition to these deities, there might have several more minor Scythian nature deities of whom no records have survived.

== Mythology ==
=== The genealogical myth ===
The Scythian genealogical myth was a myth of the Scythian religion detailing the origin of the Scythians. This myth held an important position in the worldview of Scythian society, and was popular among both the Scythians of the northern Pontic region and the Greeks who had colonised the northern shores of the Pontus Euxinus.

Five variants of the Scythian genealogical myth have been retold by Greco-Roman authors, which traced the origin of the Scythians to the god Targī̆tavah and to the Snake-Legged Goddess affiliated to Artimpasa, and represented the threefold division of the universe into the Heavens, the Earth, and the Underworld, as well as the division of Scythian society into the warrior, priest, and agriculturalist classes.

=== The Polar Cycle ===
The so-called "Polar Cycle" is a myth recorded by ancient Greek authors which is connected with the origin of the Scythians from Central Asia, and is itself of Central Asian and Siberian origin.

According to this myth, the Issedones dwelt to the east of the Scythians when they still lived in Central Asia. Beyond the Issedones lived the one-eyed Arimaspi, and then an uninhabitable desert where lived fierce gold-guarding griffins, after which were the Riphaean Mountains that were inaccessible because of perpetual snow, and beyond these mountains lived the Hyperboreans on the shores of the Sea of Ice.

In the land of the Hyperboreans, the sun would rise on the spring equinox, and would set on the autumn equinox, thus causing six months of day and six months of night. The Hyperboreans were believed to live in paradisal conditions where their fertile lands were warmed by the sun and would yield fruitful harvests without human activity, while unfavourable winds were completely absent, and the people would live very long lives.

The Rhipaean Mountains were a central part of this myth, and they separated the known world from a fantastical land beyond the reach of the North Wind, who dwelled on the mountains themselves. Therefore, the Hyperborean lands were blessed with a prosperous climate where sunshine and warmth were everlasting, and the soil was always fertile. The inhabitants of these lands lived like gods, knowing neither suffering nor hardship, nor disease, and were given everything they needed by the earth, so that they enjoyed unusual longevity, and their lives were like an eternal feast accompanied by song and music.

Some of the features of this myth find parallels in Indic traditions, which mention days and nights lasting six months, as well as the Mount Meru located at the northern edge of the world in a place dominated by extreme cold and ice, around which the celestial bodies revolved, where dwelt divine beings, and where was located the sources of gold-bearing rivers, with the mountain itself being inaccessible to mortals because of mountains.

Similar themes were also present in Avestan mythology.

== Cult ==
=== Social role ===
The worship of many of the Scythian deities were characteristic of the sedentary Thracian populations of Scythia, although the sword-cult of the god of war was a properly Iranic nomadic one.

=== Shrines ===
Scythian religion was largely aniconic, and the Scythians did not make statues of their deities for worship, with the one notable exception being the war-god, the Scythian "Ares," who was worshipped in the form of a sword. Nevertheless, the Scythians did make smaller scale images of certain of their deities for use as decorations, although Tabiti, Papaios and Api seem to have never been represented in any anthropomorphised form.

Herodotus nevertheless claimed that the Scythian tribe of the Gelonians built sanctuaries to their gods (whom he claimed were Greek gods), although this has not been archaeologically verified yet.

==== Shrines of the war god ====
The only god to whom Scythians built shrines was the war-god, the Scythian "Ares," to whom a high place was made out of a pile of brushwood, of which the three sides were upright and vertical and the fourth side formed a slope on which worshippers could walk to the top of the high place, which was itself a square-shaped platform on which the god himself was ritually represented in the form of a sword placed pointing upward.

The square shape of the altar of the Scythian "Ares" represented the four-sided "middle world," that is the air space, and the sword placed at its top represented the world axis which represented the vertical structure of the universe and connected its cosmic, central, and chthonic zones; the altar to the Scythian "Ares" was thus a model of the universe as conceptualised within Scythian cosmology, most and represented especially its central zone, the air space. The square shape of the platform might therefore have formed a representation of Scythian religion's conceptualisation of the universe as being four-sided while the sword-idol might have been a cosmic axis which united the human and divine worlds. This tall brushwood high place was thus a representation of the world mountain.

These brushwood high places could be found throughout all regions inhabited by the Scythians, and every year more brushwood was added to the high place to maintain its structure.

==== The shrine at Hylaea ====
A Greek language inscription from the later 6th century BC nevertheless recorded the existence of a shrine at which were located altars to:

- the god of the Borysthenēs river;
- Targī̆tavah, referred to in the inscription as Hēraklēs;
- the Snake-Legged Goddess, referred to in the inscription as the "Mother of the Gods."

The inscription located this shrine in the wooded region of Hylaea, where, according to the Scythian genealogical myth, was located the residence of the Snake-Legged Goddess, and where she and Targī̆tavah became the ancestors of the Scythians; the deities to whom the altars of the shrine were dedicated to were all present in the Scythian genealogical myth. The altars at the shrine of Hylaea were located in open air, and were not placed within any larger structure or building.

Women performed rituals at the shrine of Hylaea, and the Scythian prince Anacharsis was killed by his brother, the king Saulius, for having offered sacrifices to the Snake-Legged Goddess at the shrine of Hylaea.

==== The shrine at Tyras ====
A cult centre might have existed on the middle Tyras river, where the various peoples of Scythia, such as the Scythians, the Getic tribes, and the Greek colonists, believed that Targī̆tavah-Hēraklēs had left his footprint.

==== The Holy Ways ====
A holy site of the Scythians was Exampaeus (Ancient Greek: Ἐξαμπαῖος, romanized: Exampaîos), that is the Holy Ways, located between the Borysthenes and the Hypanis rivers, where was located a spring whose water was bitter and flowed into the Hypanis, thus making this latter river's water undrinkable.

At Exampaios was located a large bronze cauldron, which Herodotus described as "six fingers breadth in thickness" and capable of containing the volume of six hundred amphorae. According to Scythian legend, this cauldron was made when the king Ariantas ordered every one of his subjects to bring him a single arrowhead so he could know the exact number of his subjects. The great bronze cauldron at Hexampaeus was made out of the heap of arrowheads which accumulated from this census. This cauldron located at the Holy Ways was believed to be the centre of the world, and the legend of the arrowheads reflected that all Scythians had collective ownership of it.

This cauldron was the represented the unity of all Scythians into a single unit which was able to defend itself against its enemies.

Exampaeus was the site of a Scythian cult centre, with Targī̆tavah possibly being one of the deities worshipped there.

==== Hagion ====
The 6th century AD Eastern Roman grammarian Stephanus of Byzantium, citing the 1st century BC Greek scholar Alexander of Miletus, recorded the existence of a cult to "Asklēpios" at an uncertain location in Scythia which was called Hagion (Ancient Greek: Ἅγιον, lit. 'Holy') in Greek.

==== At Leuke ====
The Greek identification of Targī̆tavah with Achilles was connected to a myth already established in archaic times, according to which he was buried on the island of Leuke. The Greek poet Eumelus mentioned Borysthenis, that is the Earth-and-Water goddess Api who was Targī̆tavah's mother, in connection to this myth.

Due to the religious importance of the island of Leuke, spending the night there was forbidden.

==== Domestic altars ====
Many altars with ash receptacles were found at the Scythian city of Kamianka. These were used for domestic cults, although it is uncertain whether they were connected to the cult of Tabiti.

==== The Baykara site ====
At the site corresponding to modern-day Baykara in Kazakhstan, a large mound in a kurgan necropolis served as a Saka cultic structure: this mound did not contain any human burial, but instead was initially built as a mock burial pit with an accompanying ceremonial walkway, after which a mound was built over it while three passages led to an open space at the centre of the mound where religious rituals were performed. Finally, a stone platform was placed on the surface of the mound, and a cone made from a mixture of clay and sand and coloured red by passing it through fire was placed on the platform. This might have been a shrine to the Scythian "Ares."

=== Practices ===
==== Animal sacrifice ====
According to Herodotus, animal sacrifices among the Scythians to all gods except to the Scythian "Ares" were carried out by tying a rope around the front legs of the sacrificial animal, then the offerer of the sacrifice standing behind the animal and pulling the rope to throw the animal forward, and strangling it to death using a rope tied around the animal's neck and tightened using a stick. The sacrificed animal was then cut up, its flesh was boiled in a cauldron, or, for those who did not have a cauldron, in the animal's own skin, while the bones were added to the fire on which the animal's flesh was cooked so they could be consumed following the approved ritual. Once the meat was cooked, the person who initiated the sacrifice would throw some of cooked meat and entrails into the ground as an offering for the god. This method of sacrifice was typical of the more nomadic Scythians.

The cult to Thagimasadas might have involved horse sacrifice.

Animals sacrificed to the Scythian "Ares" were horses, sheep, and goats.

==== Human sacrifice ====
The Scythian "Arēs" was also propitiated using human sacrifice, which involved cutting the throat of one man out of every hundred prisoners and pouring his blood on the sword-idol of the god, and then cutting the sacrificed man's right arm and throwing it into the air and leaving it wherever it fell.

==== Ritual cannibalism ====
The Massagetai custom of eating the men of their tribe who had grown old might have reflected among Scythian peoples the presence of age classes, which were a distinguishing aspect of Iranic male societies.

==== Flagellation ====
The flagellation of boys was a ritual performed as part of the cult of the "Scythian Artemis."

==== Sun worship ====
Herodotus mentioned that the Massagetai worshipped only the Sun-god, to whom they sacrificed horses, which referred to the cult of the Iranic supreme Sun-god Miϑra, who was associated with the worship of fire and horses. When the Persian king Cyrus the Great attacked the Massagetai, their queen Tomyris swore by the Sun to kill him if he did not return to his kingdom.

The Massagetaean practice of sacrificing horses to the Sun-god was also linked to the Iranic concept of the farna, that is the royal splendour, which was believed to transform the king into a sacred figure and a kind of deity who was sometimes believed to be the brother of the Sun and the Moon.

==== Use of hemp ====
The Scythians would ritually inhale cannabis for the purposes of intoxication.

=== Clergy ===
Like among the other Indo-Iranic peoples, a class of professional priests existed among the Scythians. Scythian shaman-priests were important figures of the community who acted as keepers of knowledge.

==== The priest-king ====
The king of the Royal Scythians performed the duties of a priest during the pan-Scythian rituals which involved the hestiai of Tabiti. Among Indo-Iranic peoples, the king had a charisma which took the physical form of gold, held to be a royal metal, and therefore the king displayed his visible extraordinary powers by controlling the gold hestiai of Tabiti.

==== The Anarya ====
The Anarya (meaning "unmanly"; rendered by Greek writers as Ancient Greek: ἐνάρεες, romanized: enárees and Ancient Greek: ἀναριεῖς, romanized: anarieîs) were a section of the Scythian clergy composed of androgynous priests, who were of male sex but feminine-presenting and considered to be of a third gender.

The Anarya belonged to the most powerful Scythian aristocracy. They wore women's clothing, performed women's jobs, and spoke like women, and refrained from heterosexual intercourse. They were affiliated with an orgiastic cult of Artimpasa and the Snake-Legged Goddess, in forms strongly influenced by Near Eastern fertility goddesses.

The Anarya also acted as seers and performed a particular form of divination which, unlike the methods of traditional Scythian soothsayers, used linden bark.

==== The Agaroi ====
A section of the Scythian priesthood called the Agaroi (Ἄγαροι, Latin: Agari) was knowledgeable in the use of snake venom for medicinal purposes. During the Third Mithridatic War, these Scythian priests used snake venom to stop a thigh wound received by Mithridates VI of Pontus from haemorrhaging.

The Agaroi also knew how to use snake venom to make a powerful poison known by the ancient Greeks as the Skythikon (Σκυθικόν).

==== The Bosporan thiasoi ====
The cult of the Most High God in Tanais was performed by thiasoi (Ancient Greek: θίασοι), which were state-recognised all-male collegia of which all the free men of the city were members, including both the rank-and-file citizens and the aristocracy of Tanais. These worshippers' associations belonged to the same institution and organised the whole citizenry of Tanais into distinct groups which each had a very strict hierarchy, and around half of their memberships was ethnically Greek while the other half was ethnically Iranic.

These thiasoi originated in the Iranic institution of male societies, that is male societies of young warriors, which were present among both the Persians and the Scythians. These male societies had been Hellenised when they were incorporated into the social structure of the Bosporan Kingdom.

The typical functions of these Iranic male societies, such as the worship of Miϑra, the performing of ecstatic cults involving the consumption of haoma, and fire worship were reflected in the syncretised Bosporan cult of the Most High God, such as the depiction of the deity holding of a rhyton and facing a blazing altar on the Day of Tanais commemoration stele. Fire worship was also present among the Bosporan thiasotes in the form of the fire cult's presence among the funerary rituals of the inhabitants of Tanais. The cult of the dead of the male societies was visible in the numerous stelae the Bosporan thiasotes built in commemoration of their dead members.

Iranic male societies also maintained justice and punished law-breakers - reflected in the thiasoi officials being among the Bosporan synods' leading magistrates - and were closely connected to royal power, hence the close connection of the thiasoi and their Most High God with the Bosporan royal family and its cults. And, like the Iranic male societies, the Bosporan thiasoi were divided into age classes, and required initiations so members could join an ideal community of alive and deceased warriors.

=== Festivals ===
==== Renewal of the high place ====
The Scythians would annually bring more brushwood to the high place of the Scythian "Ares" to maintain its structure. This ceremony also symbolised a recommitment and created a consciousness of the continuity of worship at the high place, and was also a reaffirmation of tribal identity.

==== Sacrifices to the war-god ====
Every year, the Scythians held a ceremony to honour their "Ares" during which they sacrificed cattle, horses and every hundredth prisoner of war to him. Libations of wine were poured over the prisoners who were to be sacrificed, following which their throats were cut over a vessel to catch their blood. This vessel was carried to the top of the brushwood high place of the god and the prisoners' blood was poured as libations on the sword functioning as the god's idol, and their right arms were severed and thrown into the sky and left wherever they fell.

The use of horses and of the blood and right arms of prisoners in the cult of the Scythian "Ares" was a symbolic devotion of the swiftness of horses and the strength of men to this god of kingship who had similar powers, and the tall brushwood altar on which the blood was offered to the god was a representation of the world mountain.

No priests were required for the sacrifices to the Scythian "Ares."

==== Communal drinking ====
The Scythians held an annual ceremony where everyone who had killed at least one enemy was acknowledged by being allowed to drink from a communal bowl of wine in front of the assembled company, although it is unknown whether or not this festivity was performed at the same time as the yearly sacrifices to the Scythian "Ares."

==== Other festivals ====
Herodotus of Halicarnassus mentioned that, every three years, the Scythian tribe of the Gelonians performed a Bacchic-type festival which he interpreted as a festival to the Greek god Dionysos.

== Customs ==
=== Royal customs ===
==== The royal divine marriage ====
The signet ring of the Scythian king Scyles, whose bezel was decorated with the image of a woman seated on a throne and holding a mirror in her right hand and a sceptre in her left hand, with Skuleō (ΣΚΥΛΕΩ) engraved near the figure of the goddess, and on whose band was inscribed lit. 'Tell to be with Argotas!' in Greek (Ancient Greek: ΚΕΛΕΟΕ ΑΡΓΟΤΑΝ ΠΑΡ ΕΝΑΙ, romanized: Keleoe Argotan par enai), represented communion with Artimpasa as guaranteeing sovereignty in Scythian religion.

The image of the Artimpasa on the ring was therefore a representation of her as a granter of sovereignty, with the ring having been inherited from generation to generation of the Scythian royal dynasty as a token of royal power, and Argotas being a former Scythian king from whom his descendant Skula inherited this ring. The ring did not feature any image of the male partner of the goddess because the kings were themselves considered to be these partners, with the Scythian royal investiture having been considered both a communion between man and the goddess as well as a marital union which elevated the king to the status of spouse of the goddess and granted him power through sexual intercourse with the goddess.

This was also a reflection of Levantine influence on Artimpasa, since Mesopotamian equivalents of Aphrodite Urania were sometimes represented together with the king in scenes represented sacred marriages, and the stability of royal power in Paphos was believed to be derived from intimate relations between Aphrodite, with whom the queen of Paphos was identified, and the king, who claimed descent from Aphroditē's lover Cinyras.

A similar rite of the marriage between the king and the great goddess existed among the Scythians' Thracian neighbours.

==== The royal fārnā ====
All Iranic peoples considered gold to be a symbol of fārnā and its material incarnation, as well as the metal of the warrior-aristocracy, with the ownership of the fārnā in the form of gold being necessary for a warrior to be victorious. Thus, the connection of the fārnā and gold with the king represented its connection to the warrior-aristocracy to which the kings belonged. In consequence, Iranic kings surrounded themselves with gold, which was supposed to help them preserve their fārnā, hence why Scythian kings only used gold cups, which represented the priestly role of royal power.

Among the Persians, who are an Iranic people distantly related to the Scythians, the Achaemenid kings kept large numbers of gold objects in their palaces which would help them preserve their farnah due to the Iranic belief of gold being a material representation of farnah.

Because the fārnā was believed to have a solar nature, and therefore to be dangerous and capable of harming ordinary humans. As a result of the perceived dangerous nature of the royal farnah, Achaemenid kings were not supposed to come in direct contact with ordinary people, and all interactions between members of the ordinary population and the king had to be made through special intermediates appointed by the king himself. Similarly, the Scythian kings avoided direct contact with members of the populace, and instead communicated with them through the means of royally-appointed messengers who were buried with the kings after their deaths.

The existence of the concept of the fārnā among the Scythic peoples is attested in multiple recorded Sarmatian names, such as Khopharnos (Χοφαρνος), Ariapharnos (Αριαφαρνος), Saitapharnēs (Σαιταφαρνης), and Pharnagos (Φαρναγος).

==== The ritual sleep ====
The ritual sleep was a ceremony during which a substitute ritual king would ceremonially sleep in an open air field along with the gold hestiai for a single night, possibly as a symbolical ritual impregnation of the earth. This substitute king would receive as much land as he could ride around in one day: this land belonged to the real king and was given to the substitute king to complete his symbolic identification with the real king, following which he would be allowed to live for one year until he would be sacrificed when the time for the next ritual sleep festival would arrive and a successor of the ritual king was chosen. This ceremony also represented the death and rebirth of the Scythian king and was conducted at the Holy Ways, where the great bronze cauldron representing the centre of the world was located.

The ceremony of the ritual sleep was the main event of the Scythian calendar, during which the Scythian kings would worship the gold hestiai with rich sacrifices. The ceremony might have been held at the moment of the Scythian calendar corresponding to the fall of the gold objects from the heavens.

=== Divination ===
==== Willow stick divination ====
Traditional Scythian soothsayers used willow withies for divination. This method of divination involved placing a bundle of willow sticks on the ground, untying it, and laying out the individual sticks.

==== Linden bark divination ====
A particular form of divination which was performed by the Anarya used linden bark; the Anarya performed this form of divination by splitting the linden bark and twining the strands among open fingers.

=== Funerary customs ===
When Scythians died, the brain and intestines of the deceased were removed, their bodies were filled with fragrant herbs and sewn up, and wax was rubbed on their bodies, after which the embalmed corpse was driven on a carriage in a funeral procession.

Deceased Scythians were buried in wooden structures resembling log cabins, floored with dark felt, and with rooves covered with layers of larch, birch bark and moss. Within these structures, the bodies of the deceased were placed in log trunk coffins together with some of their prized possessions, while slaughtered horses were placed in the grave shaft, all with the goal of equipping the deceased with what was considered necessary for them in the afterlife.

Scythian funeral customs recorded by Graeco-Roman authors have been archaeologically attested, and, although there were certain established rules in carrying them out, the more minutious details were not always the same, and Scythian burials exhibit variations from individual to individual.

The burial mounds over Scythian tombs were usually built using unburnt bricks, which were then covered with a coat of clay, and then a stone covering. The Scythian burial mounds were not too different across class lines, with their structures and rituals being largely the same, and the upper class mounds being simply larger and more monumental and containing more lavish grave goods than those of the lower classes. The mounds of the poorer members of the population were usually 1 metre high, while those of the upper classes could reach up to 12 to 15 metres in height.

==== Royal funerals ====
When Scythian kings died, they were embalmed and their funeral processions were driven throughout their kingdom. All those who met the dead king would cut off one of their earlobes, cut their nose open, cut their foreheads, and pierce their left hands with an arrow.

Once the mourning procession was complete, it went to the country of Gerrhos where the king was buried by being placed on a mat and placed in the grave; one of the king's wives, as well as his cupbearer, cook, groom, servant, messenger, as well as horses and cattle were strangled and buried with him to follow him in the afterlife. Thus, the king's wealth, entourage and wealth were all his property that he took with him in the afterlife. Gold objects were also buried along with the king: due to the belief that gold was the physical manifestation of the royal fārnā, the cups representing the priestly role of royal power that were placed in the burials of the earliest Scythian kings at Kelermes were all made of gold.

A tent-like structure was then erected over the grave using poles and wickerwork, and the burial chamber was covered with brushwood and mats over which the mound of unburnt bricks was built: these unburnt bricks were themselves made from the soil of the king's pastures, which were his property, so that part of them would accompany him in the afterlife. A stone base sometimes ran beneath the edges of these burial mounts, and a cone was sometimes placed inside them to stabilise them.

A year after the funeral, the people came at the tomb, increased its height, and placed 50 horses each with a killed warrior placed on them over the mound.

The kurgans of the Pontic Scythians all followed the same basic structure, with monumental mounds covering underground tombs containing the burial of Scythian nobles, their wife, entourage, horses, jewellery, most valuable clothes, and other precious possessions and household items. The building of these large tombs was itself a communal action for which large numbers of people had to come together for a large period of time and had to be organised, housed and fed, even when those building the mounds were slaves.

The Scythians of Ciscaucasia buried their royalty with human sacrifices and burnt horse hecatombs, which were practices adopted by the Scythians from the native West Asian peoples of Transcaucasia and Mesopotamia, and which the Scythians in turn introduced into the Steppe. These customs were however not adopted by the other Scythians of the Pontic steppe.

The 18 metre-high Solokha kurgan consisted of two burial chambers located to the left and right of a walkway: in one of the chambers was located the deceased, whose clothes were decorated with gold sheets sewn into them; the other chamber contained a bronze cauldron, wooden cups with gold fittings, silver kylikes, and Greek amphorae.

The Solokha burial mound contained another tomb with a long corridor running north from the entrance shaft of the burial chamber, where were located the bodies of two young warriors. A side niche on the northern wall contained another dead warrior who was equipped with a sword, spears, and a gōrytos, and who might have been the armsbearer or bodyguard of the noble buried in this kurgan. The noble himself was buried in an east-facing side alcove, and he wore various status symbols of Scythian rulers, such as a gold necklace, gold bracelets, a gilded akinakes, a sceptre in the right hand, gold plates decorated with figures sewn into his clothing, bronze vessels, and Greek drinking vessels. A dozen amphorae of wine were also located in a small side chamber.

The Chortomlyk kurgan, of similar dimensions as the Solokha kurgan, contained a 10 metre-long entrance shaft at the end of which were located four burial chambers branching out of it similarly to a clover leaf:

- the southeastern chamber contained wine amphorae, a bronze cauldron, and clothes decorated with sheets;
- the northeastern chamber contained six amphorae and the skeleton of a cupbearer with a gōrytos and gold sheet-decorated clothing;
- the southwestern chamber contained the skeletons of two servants or guards laid side by side, and whose weapons and clothing were decorated with gold;
- the northwestern chamber contained the skeleton of a queen covered with gold plates decorated with figures, and alongside whom was the skeleton of her female servant and 15 wine amphorae, of which one was made of silver.

This chamber led to the main burial chamber of the complex, where was buried the king along with gold sheets, a gold gōrytos fitting decorated with a scene of the myth of Achilles, and two swords with gold hilts.

At Melitopol was located a 12 metre-deep kurgan where the central burial chamber of a noble contained a large golden gōrytos similar to the one from Chortomlyk, and both were likely made at the same workshop in one of the Greek colonies on the northern shore of the Black Sea. To the north was the burial chamber of the noble's wife, which contained thousands of decorative gold sheet trimmings; a servant wearing simple pearly jewellery was buried at the entrance of the queen's chamber along with eleven wine amphorae, and the remains of a wooden wagon which was used for the queen's funeral procession was located in the entrance shaft.

==== Aristocratic funerals ====
The kurgans where were buried Scythian aristocrats were decorated on their surface with stelae consisting of large slabs of rocks whose surfaces had been carved into crude human figures in relief and which represented armed men whose dress, swords and weapons had been sculpted in detail. This tradition had already existed in the region of the Pontic Steppe since the 3rd millennium BC, and had later been adopted by the Scythians.

The rich furnishings of Scythian tombs demonstrate that Scythians devoted significant resources to ensuring the proper burial of their members, especially of nobles. This attested that the afterlife was extremely important in Scythian religion.

==== Priestly burials ====
Sarmatians buried their priestesses with mirrors, which were symbols of feminine principle, eroticism and fertility that played an important role in the wedding rites of Iranic peoples, and were believed to be magical objects used for prophecy and shamanic rites. The Sarmatian citizens of the city of Tanais were buried along with weapons as well as with pieces of chalk and realgar which functioned as symbols of fire, while their graves were accompanied by burial constructions shaped as circular stone fences. These, along with horse harnesses being present in pit graves, as well as the burial of horses in tumuli, attested of the importance of the solar and fire cults in Sarmatian funerary rites.

==== Commoner burials ====
Commoners were also embalmed and their bodies were also displayed in a 40 day-long funeral procession to the relatives and friends of the deceased, and a farewell feast for the clan was held where food was served to both the living people who drove the procession and the corpse of the deceased.

Commoner tombs were usually oriented in an east–west direction, and the dead were laid on their backs in the same direction in the burial chambers which were accessible through ceremonial walkways.

Remains of funeral feasts, such as remains of consumed animals, imported amphorae of Greek wine, and local tableware, have been found in commoner burials. The tombs of men were furnished with warrior equipment such as swords, spears, gōrytoi filled with arrows, and bows; women tombs contained beads, earrings, spindle whorls, and mirrors; gold rings, pearls, and trimmings decorated with gold leaf were rare in these burials.

==== Ritual cleansing ====
After funerals, the members of the community would cleanse themselves by washing their head with soap.

After this, the men would ritually clean themselves in a steam bath in a small tipi-like tent made of woolen mats laid over three wooden poles. At the centre of the tent was laid a pit containing red-hot stones on which the Scythians threw the flower buds of cannabis so as to induce intoxication. The scholar Adrienne Mayor has observed that this custom is very similar to the preparations for the sweat lodge ceremonies of the Indigenous peoples of the Americas.

The women meanwhile ritually cleaned themselves with a paste made from the wood of cypress and cedar, ground together with frankincense, and water on a stone until it acquired a thick consistency. The women then applied this paste over themselves and removed it after a day, leaving their skin clean, glossy, and sweet-smelling.

Due to increasing Scythian and Sarmatian cultural influence in Pantikapaion, the deceased were often depicted as mounted horsemen on murals in their funerary vaults and tombstones at the same time as the horseman became a recurring motif in Late Scythian and Sarmatian art in the first centuries of the Common Era.

=== Art ===
The motifs of Scythian cultures' Animal style art represented the threefold division of the universe into the heavens, in which were depicted birds of prey; the airspace, within which were represented hoofed animals; and finally the earthly realm, where were images of snakes, fish, and predatory animals. This division of the universe is also attested in a passage of the Avesta, where Vər^{ə}ϑraγna shows to Zaraϑuštra the vision of a vulture in the sky, a stallion on the earth, and the Kara fish in the water.

The motifs of the Scythian cultures' animal style art also reflected the cosmological notion of the ever-present struggle of life which was held to be the essence of being. These motifs consisted of stags (sometimes substituted by elks, moose, and rams), depicted as noble beasts in repose whose legs are tucked underneath their bodies, and which represented Tree of Life which sustained the world which was always in tension. The other components of these motifs were snow leopard-like felines and birds of prey, which were represented competing with each other for the herbivores, thus creating an interlocking style of tension. These compositions featuring predator and prey were present throughout the Scythian cultures, from the Pontic Steppe to the Altai Mountains.

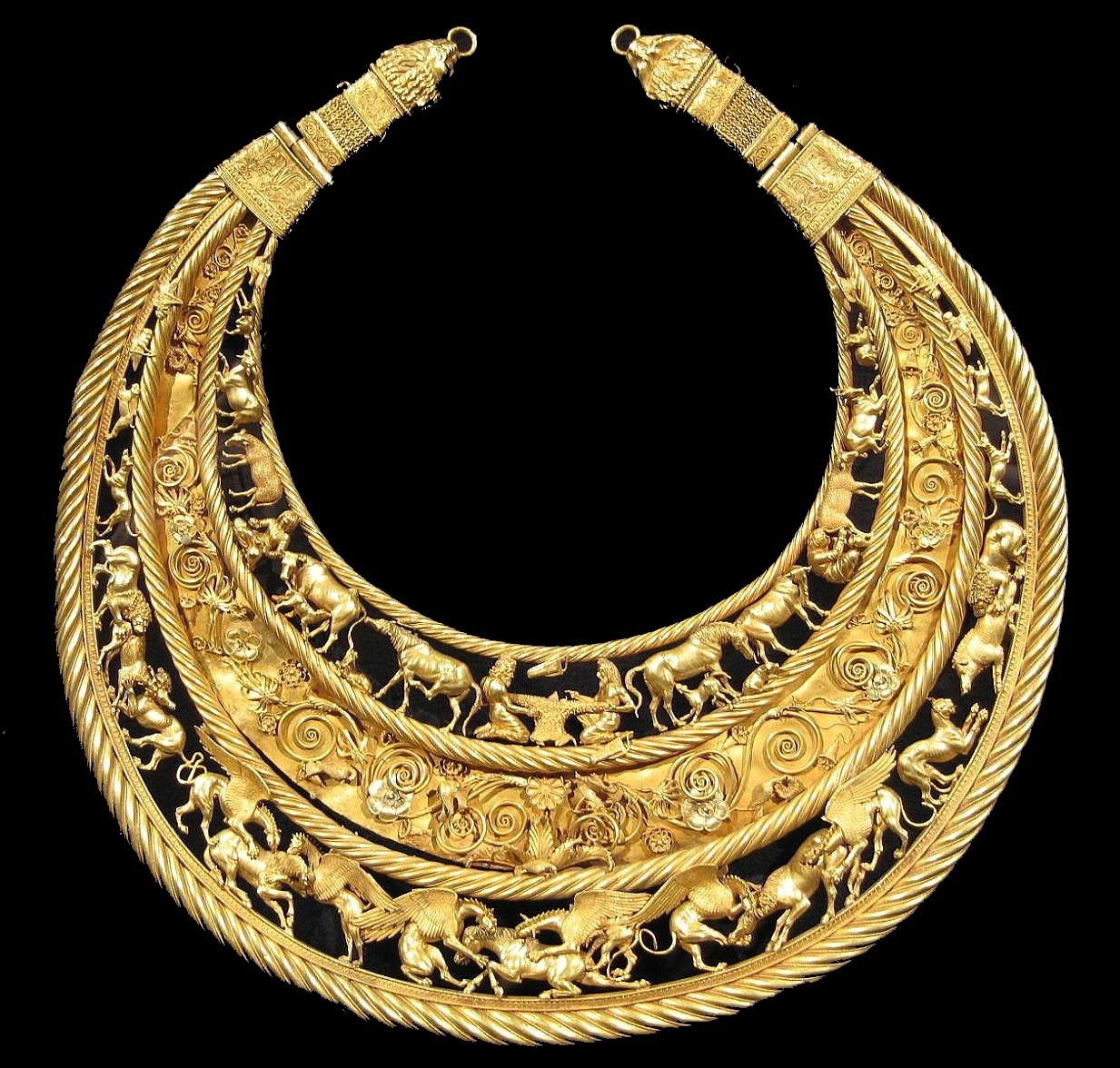
The Golden Pectoral from Tovsta Mohyla. In the upper frieze: Scythians tending to their domesticated animals In the lower frieze: griffins, lions, and caracals attacking horses, deer, and pigs

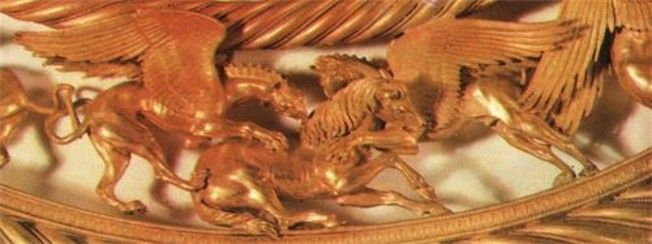
Griffins attacking a horse from the Tovsta Mohyla gold pectoral

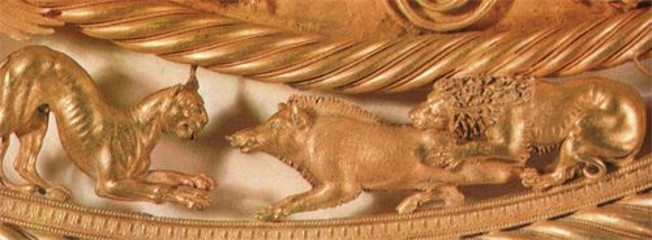
A lion and a caracal attacking a wild boar from the Tovsta Mohyla gold pectoral

In the western regions, the Scythians during their stay in West Asia adopted motifs such as lamassus combining the powers of humans, bulls, and eagles, and who flanked the Tree of Life.

Later, under Greek influence, the art of the Pontic Scythians underwent an evolution, with the majestic stags being replaced by docile deer or horses or rams, the felines' designs changing from snow leopard-like into images of lions, and the birds of prey becoming winged griffins, although the central theme of the struggle between predator and prey remained the same. This Greek-influenced Scythian animal art is visible in the lower frieze of the Golden Pectoral from Tovsta Mohyla, where two griffins attack a horse in its centre, while the rest of the frieze depicts lions and caracals attacking stags and pigs. The upper frieze instead represents humans interacting with their domesticated animals to counterpose the harmony of the human world with the conflict of the supernatural realm, as well as to equate the humans with the predators with respect to their relationship with the productive power of the earth.

In the eastern regions, the predator-prey motif could be found depicted on the Saka saddle covers from the Pazyryk kurgans and leather flasks, as well as tattooed on the bodies of the deceased buried in the kurgans.

These motifs represented the perspectives of hunters, and this imagery was used to decorate only movable items such as weapons, clothing, accessories, and horse harnesses and equipment, with the stylised animals representing supernatural forces which were appropriated by the ones who wore them.

Additionally, from the 4th century BC onwards, depictions of Scythian deities, sometimes represented under the guise of Greek deities, became commonplace in Scythian art. These images were not only decorative, but also acted as protective talismans.

== Religious syncretism ==
=== Hellenic syncretism ===
The Ancient Greeks who had established colonies on the northern shores of the Black Sea, which corresponded to the southern limits of Scythia, had adopted Scythian cultic practices and myths. These Greeks held the site at Hylaea as a shrine common to both Greeks and Scythians where they worshipped:

- the god Borysthenēs;
- the Scythian ancestor-god Targī̆tavah, whom the Greeks identified with Hēraklēs;
- and the Snake-Legged Goddess, whom the Greeks identified with their own mother of the gods, Cybele, due to her chthonic nature.

The Greeks of Pontic Olbia often identified the Snake-Legged Goddess with their own goddesses Cybele, Demeter and Hecate. Connected to these Greek identifications of the Snake-Legged goddess was a temple of the Greek goddess Demeter on Cape Hippolaus and a sacred grove of the Greek goddess Hecate at Kinburn Spit, respectively marking the north and south entrances of the Borysthenes river.

These Greek colonists borrowed the cult of Targī̆tavah and Hellenised it into a cult of Hēraklēs at an early date, during the 7th to 6th centuries BC, due to which the cult of Hēraklēs enjoyed significant importance at Pontic Olbia from a very early period despite Hēraklēs not featuring prominently in the religious traditions of the homeland of Olbia's founders at Miletus.

The Hellenised variant of the Scythian genealogical myth also functioned for the north Pontic Greeks as an origin myth for the cult of Targī̆tavah-Hēraklēs at Hylaea.

The Olbiopolitan Greeks also worshipped Achilles in his form identified with Targī̆tavah at Hylaea. The cult of Achilles Pontarkhēs very popular in Pontic Olbia, with the large number of dedications to him by priests and archons having been offered at this city suggesting that he enjoyed state cult there.

==== Hellenic influence among Scythians ====
The ancient Greeks in southern Scythia also promoted the worship of their own god Apollo in Scythia, which resulted in the myth of Apollo's connection with the northern limits of the world from where the Hyperboreans sent gifts to the sanctuary of this god at Delos, as well as the myth of Abaris and the arrow of Apollo. The introduction of the cult of Apollo Boreas at Olbia was itself under the influence of this myth, according to which Apollo travelled to the northern edge of the world.

The cult of Apollo in Scythia was largely limited to the city of Olbia, although a red-figure kylix in which was inscribed a dedication to two epithets of Apollo was found in a Scythian kurgan at Zhurivka, which suggests the adoption of the cult of Apollo from Olbia by the Scythians.

An amphora found in the western temenos at Olbia where was located the temple of Apollo Iētros (lit. 'Apollo the Healer') recorded the dedication of "paternal honey" to this god by a Scythian named Anaperrēs, who may have been the son of the famous Scythian prince Anacharsis.

Some figures of lions and rams on handles of Greek-made bronze mirrors found across Eurasia attests of the existence of Greek cults in these regions of the world, suggesting that Greek cults had spread there.

==== Scythian influence among Greeks ====
The common use of arrows by Scythians also led to the practice of offering arrowhead-shaped coins as votive gifts in the cult of Apollo Iētros in the cities of the northwestern shores of the Black Sea.

The later Graeco-Roman authors Philostratus and Apollonius of Tyana recorded that the Spartans in Greece had adopted the worship of the "Scythian Artemis." The Spartans appear to have adopted this Scythian cult at a very early date.

== Typographical note ==
This article uses cursive theta ⟨ϑ⟩ to denote the Scythian voiceless dental fricative (IPA /θ/), and regular theta ⟨θ⟩ to denote the Greek aspirated, voiceless dental plosive (IPA /tʰ/).

== See also ==
- Ancient Iranic religion
- Abaris the Hyperborean
- Horse sacrifice
- Iranian religions
- Issyk kurgan
- Kurgan stelae
- Ossetian religion
- Paleo-Balkanic mythology
- Scythian art
