= Ariantas =

Ancient Scythian king

- King of Scythians
- Religion: Scythian religion

Ariantas (Scythian: *Ariyā̆nta; Ancient Greek: Άριάντας, romanized: Ariantás; Latin: Ariantas) was a king of the Scythians, who, in order to learn the population of his people, commanded every Scythian to bring him one arrow-head. With these arrow-heads he made an enormous brazen or copper vessel, which was set up in a place called "Exampaeus", between the rivers Borysthenes and Hypanis. This was important because the total number of Scythians had always been difficult to determine, because of their nomadic behaviors.

We know of Ariantas only from one single passage in Herodotus.

== Other sources ==
=== Ancient Armenian historygraphy ===
Some researchers hold the view that Artaxias the First (Artashes), mentioned in the «History of Armenia» by M. Chorene, is identified with Ariantes, mentioned by Herodotus, who, during a campaign in Asia Minor, ordered each of his soldiers to present a single arrowhead to determine the size of his army.

Thus, M. Chorene writes:

"He orders the army to be brought from the east and the north in such great numbers that he did not even know their count. He ordered a stone the size of a human head to be placed on the roads and in military camps as a sign of their multitude. Then he goes to the west and, having defeated the Lydian army, arrests their king, Croesus." After this, M. Chorene, citing the words of Evagoras and Scamandrus, says: "Artaxias the First /Ariantes/, having captured the king of the Lydians, orders him to be put to death by being placed on an iron frying pan; Croesus, recalling the words of Solon of Athens, exclaims in his own language: 'O Solon, Solon, you said well that one cannot bless a man's happiness until his death.' Hearing this, Artaxias the First Ariantes/orders him to be forgiven and not tortured" (later, Croesus offered stubborn resistance to the raids of Cyrus the Great).

A quote from the account of Phlegon, written by M. Chorene, states: "The great commander was stronger than all kings: he not only expelled the Lydians and bound their king, but also at the Hellespont and in Thrace he traversed the sea like an infantryman; his reputation enchanted the Hellenic world, and all of Hellas feared him."

Regarding the final years of the reign of Artaxias the First /Ariantes/, M. Chorene writes: "I cannot say under what influence, but a great noise and confusion arise, and his numerous troops begin to kill one another" and, according to Evagoras and Phlegon, "Artaxias the First (Ariantes), renowned for great victories, was killed by his own troops while fleeing the turmoil."

=== Belarusian mythology ===
According to Belarusian mythology, there was a campaign of Ariantas against Neurida. According to these traditions, The Scythian invasion, driven by the geopolitical ambition to enslave the Neurian populations and secure the vast forest pastures for the nomadic elite, is depicted as an threat to the ancestral lands. The narrative emphasizes the resilience of the Neuri people, whose profound connection to their environment—characterized by impenetrable forests and sacred river sources—transformed the landscape into a lethal instrument of asymmetrical warfare against the numerically superior Scythian hordes.

The climax of the myth focuses on the strategic failure of Ariantas upon reaching the hydrographic hub of the Styr, Horyn, and Western Bug rivers. Deceived by the apparent desolation and the daunting "emerald thickets" of Neurida, the tyrant committed a fatal tactical error by dividing his army into three separate contingents to scout the riverine trails. This fragmentation neutralized the Scythians' primary advantage of mobility and concentrated force, leading to their total encirclement and subsequent annihilation within the dense woodlands. According to this legend, Ariantas was killed by Neurian.

== Ariant's Cauldron ==
Herodotus himself located Arianth and his kingdom somewhere in the vast expanses of present-day Ukraine, calling Arianth's entire country Exampeia. Other historians pushed Arianth and his people to the Balkans or to the upper reaches of the Tanais — that is, the Don. The Zoroastrian interpreter of the Avesta, Ul d'Asan, describing his journey along the Ra (Volga) and its basin for the Shah of Persia, recounts hearing of the steppe "Cythean" city of Exampeia, where once a year all of King Arianth's warriors flock to a victory feast to drink a certain "suritsa" from a giant cauldron.

Exampeia translates as "Sacred Paths," explains Alexander Bosy, a candidate of historical sciences. "The Scythians called this the Sinyukha River, along with its tributary, the Bolshaya Vysya, and the area between three rivers—the Exampeus, the Borysthenes, and the Hypanis. It was from here, from the center of Scythia, that sacred paths to all corners of the Scythian empire began, sacred paths to the majestic royal burial mounds, sacred river routes along which the Scythians transported grain to Greece and Rome."

According to legend, Ariantas wanted to count how many people lived in Scythia but couldn't figure out how, — says historican Alexander Georgievich. — He dreamed of a battle where Scythian warriors shot arrows simultaneously, defeating the enemy. The arrows stuck in the field like ears of wheat. The king tried to gather them but realized it was impossible. Upon waking, Ariantas consulted the Magi, who interpreted the dream as a divine hint: order every living Scythian to bring a bronze arrowhead or face death. Arrowheads poured in, and the Magi counted until they ran out of known numbers. The king rejoiced that his subjects outnumbered all known figures and ordered the arrowheads smelted into a cauldron. For years, arrowheads were brought to Exampaeus and added to the cauldron, which grew to an immense size, astonishing even Herodotus.

Herodotus wrote that Ariantas's cauldron was six times larger than the one Pausanias dedicated to the gods at the entrance to Pontus (Black Sea), holding 3,600 amphorae (144,000 liters) with walls six fingers thick. Kyiv University associate professor V. Koval calculated its dimensions: diameter 8.2 m, weight 22 tons. Dividing the cauldron's estimated mass by the weight of a Scythian arrowhead (10 g), historians estimated Scythia's population at over 12 million in the 7th century BCE.

Herodotus located the cauldron where a "bitter river" flows into the Hypanis (Southern Bug), a four-day sail upstream. Candidates for this river include Hnylyi Tashlyk, Mertvovod, and Solonykha, with Synyukha and Chorny Tashlyk also suggested. The exact location is disputed; the cauldron appears on the coat of arms of Novoukrainka district, while Mykolaiv region claims it lies within their borders. Notably, there's no record of such a massive cauldron being moved. Some historians speculate Hitler was intrigued by the cauldron, citing the early approval of the Werwolf bunker near Vinnytsia in November 1940. However, this remains a hypothesis.

=== Ahnenerbe hypothis ===
Herodotus also describes a Scythian ritual directly linked to Ariantas's cauldron, which may explain the Third Reich's obsession with finding this ancient artifact and unlocking Scythian sacred secrets. According to the author, each year on the anniversary of the Scythian victory over Darius's army, the cauldron was filled with wine. The people and the army would drink from it to strengthen their fighting spirit and gain power for new conquests. The Scythians kept the cauldron immaculate; its interior surface was polished to a perfect shine, resembling a curved mirror.

Such objects were used for magical purposes. It was believed that a spherical mirror could best gather "astral light," facilitating clairvoyance and the ability to see the future. This suggests why Hitler was so fixated on the search: perhaps he sought not only world domination but also the power of foresight. It remains unknown whether the Germans actually found the Scythian cauldron, and researchers still debate the outcome.
