= Solokha =

Scythian burial mound in Ukraine

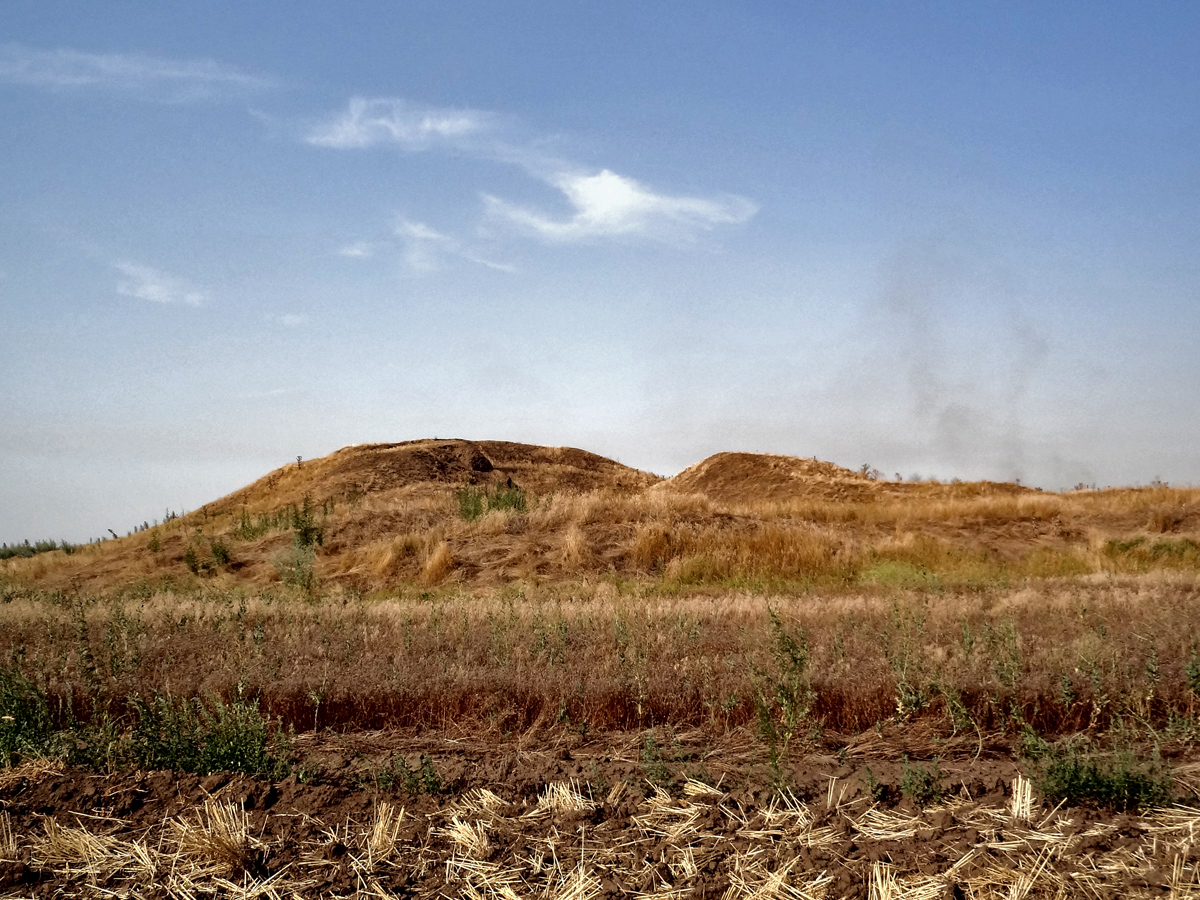
- Solokha in 2011
- Interactive map of Solokha

Immovable Monument of National Significance of Ukraine
- Official name: Курганний могильник "Солоха" (Solokha kurgan grave field)
- Type: Archaeology
- Reference no.: 080010-Н

Solokha is also the name of a witch in Rimsky-Korsakov's opera Christmas Eve.
Solokha is also a hamlet at 49.969°N 34.330°E.

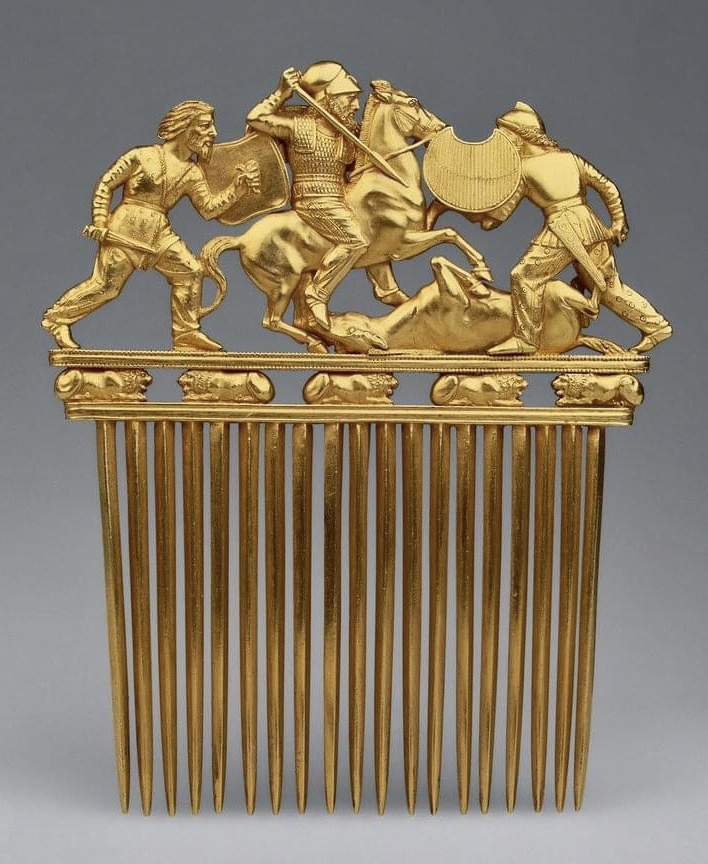
Scythian golden comb, probably made by Greeks, from Solokha, early 4th century BCE, Hermitage Museum

The Solokha (Солоха) kurgan is on the left bank of the Dnieper, 18 km from Kamianka-Dniprovska, opposite Nikopol, in central Ukraine. It has a height of 19 m and a diameter of about 100 m, dating to the early 4th century BC.

The burial mound contained two royal Scythian tombs, the central tomb had been robbed already in antiquity, but still contained the remains of a female ruler and two horses in rich attire, while the side tomb was found intact by the 1912–13 campaign by the Russian archaeologist Nikolay Veselovsky.

The intact lateral tomb yielded spectacular treasures. It contained the remains of a male ruler, completely covered in gold. He had been buried with his weapon bearer, a servant and five horses. He was armed with bronze greaves, a bronze helmet, and a sword in a sheath covered with gold sheets and a quiver covered in silver containing 80 bronze arrowheads. The most notable find in the grave, however, was a golden comb with an extremely detailed group of three fighting warriors worked in gold. The comb, as well as other finds, are part of the Hermitage Museum's holdings of Scythian art.

The site appears to have confirmed the historicity of an account of Herodotus. It is in an area where according to Herodotus the "royal Scythians" buried their kings, the land of Gerrhos, corresponding approximately to the modern Zaporizhzhia Oblast.

== Literature ==
- Schiltz, Véronique, Kelermès et Solokha, Les Dossiers d'archéologie ISSN 1141-7137, no 259 (2000–2001), 20–23.
- Алексеев А.Ю. К идентификации погребений кургана Солоха //Тез. докл. междунар. конф. «Проблемы скифо-сарматской археологии Северного Причерноморья», посвящ. 95-летию со дня рождения профессора Б.Н.Гракова. – Запорожье, 1994. – II.
- Алексеев А.Ю. Гребень из кургана Солоха в контексте династической истории Скифии //Эрмитажные чтения памяти Б.Б.Пиотровского. Тез. докл. – Санкт-Петербург, 1996.
- Кузнецов C. В. Щиты на золотом гребне из кургана «Солоха» //Проблемы ски-фо-сарматской археологии Северного Причерноморья (К 100-летию Б.Н.Гракова). – Запорожье, 1999.Мозолевський Б.М. Солоха // Мозолевський Б.М. Скіфський степ. – Київ, 1983. - С. 83-94
- Манцевич А.П. Гребень и фиала из кургана Солоха //СА. – 1951. – XIII.
- Манцевич А.П. Золотой гребень из кургана Солоха. – Ленинград: Изд-во ГЭ, 1962.
- Манцевич А.П. Горит из кургана Солоха //ТГЭ. – 1962. – Т.3.
- Манцевич А.П. Курган Солоха. Публикация одной коллекции. – Ленинград:Искусство, 1987.
- Половцова С. Объяснение изображений на драгоценных вещах из Солохи проф. Свороносом //ИАК. – 1918. – Вып. 65.
- Русяева М.В. Золотой гребень из кургана Солоха //VI чтения памяти профессора В.Д.Блаватского. К 100-летию со дня рождения. Тезисы докладов 21-22 мая 1999 г. – М., 1999. – С.96-97.
- Русяева М.В. Сцена охоты на чаше из кургана Солоха // V Боспорские чтения. Боспор Киммерийский и варварский мир в период античности и средневековья. Этнические процессы. – Керчь, 2004. – С. 301–306.
- Русяева М.В. Серебряная чаша из кургана Солоха // Боспорские исследования. – Вып. IX. – Керчь, 2005. – C. 112–126.
- Фармаковский Б.В. Горит из кургана Солоха //ИРАИМК. – 1922. – II.
