= Gerrhos =

Gerrhos (Greek "reed-swamp") is a place in Scythia essential to interpreting Herodotus' world-map, for it formed one of the corners of the great square that defined Scythia. A more familiar Gerrhos or reed-swamp — from the Alexandrian point of view — lay to the east of the mouth of the Nile. Herodotus drew a meridian between the two Gerrhoi: that in Scythia was considered the source of the Boristhenes Dnieper. In the words of Herodotus (IV.53):

As far inland as the place named Gerrhos, which is distant forty days’ voyage from the sea, its course is known, and its direction is from north to south; but above this, no one has traced it, so as to say through what countries it flows. It enters the territory of the Scythian Husbandmen after running for some time through a desert region... It is the only river besides the Nile the sources of which are unknown...

Livio Catullo Stecchini, a historian of earth-measuring whose work included many controversial elements, assigned as Gerrhos, the area of swamps to the northeast of Smolensk, today considerably reduced by post-glacial warming and drying of the climate and by the conscious drainage and intrusion of agriculture. Later classical historians and geographers, such as Pomponius Mela mislocated this Gerrhos.

== See also ==
- Solokha kurgan
