= Krasny Mayak =

Krasny Mayak Красный Маяк
- Village
- Location within Bashkortostan Location within Russia
- Coordinates: 52°24′N 55°42′E
- Country: Russia
- Region: Bashkortostan
- District: Kuyurgazinsky District

Population (2010)
  - Total: 169
- Time zone: UTC+5:00
- Postal code: 453365

Krasny Mayak (Russian: Красный Маяк; Bashkir: Красный Маяк) is a rural locality (a village) in Muraptalovsky Selsoviet, Kuyurgazinsky District, Bashkortostan, Russia. The population was 169 as of 2010. There is 1 street.

== Geography ==
Krasny Mayak is located 44 km south of Yermolayevo (the district's administrative centre) by road. Kyzyl-Mayak is the nearest rural locality. According to the administrative-territorial directory of the Republic of Bashkortostan, straight-line distances from Krasny Mayak are 42 km to the district centre, Yermolayevo; 8 km to the selsoviet centre, Novomuraptalovo; and 8 km to the nearest railway station, Muraptalovo.

== Demographics ==
The population is predominantly Bashkir (73%) and Sunni Muslim, according to the 2002 census.
