= Scythians =

Nomadic Iranic people of the Pontic Steppe

Scythians *Skuδa (earlier) *Skula (later)
- c. 9th/8th century BC–c. 3rd century BC
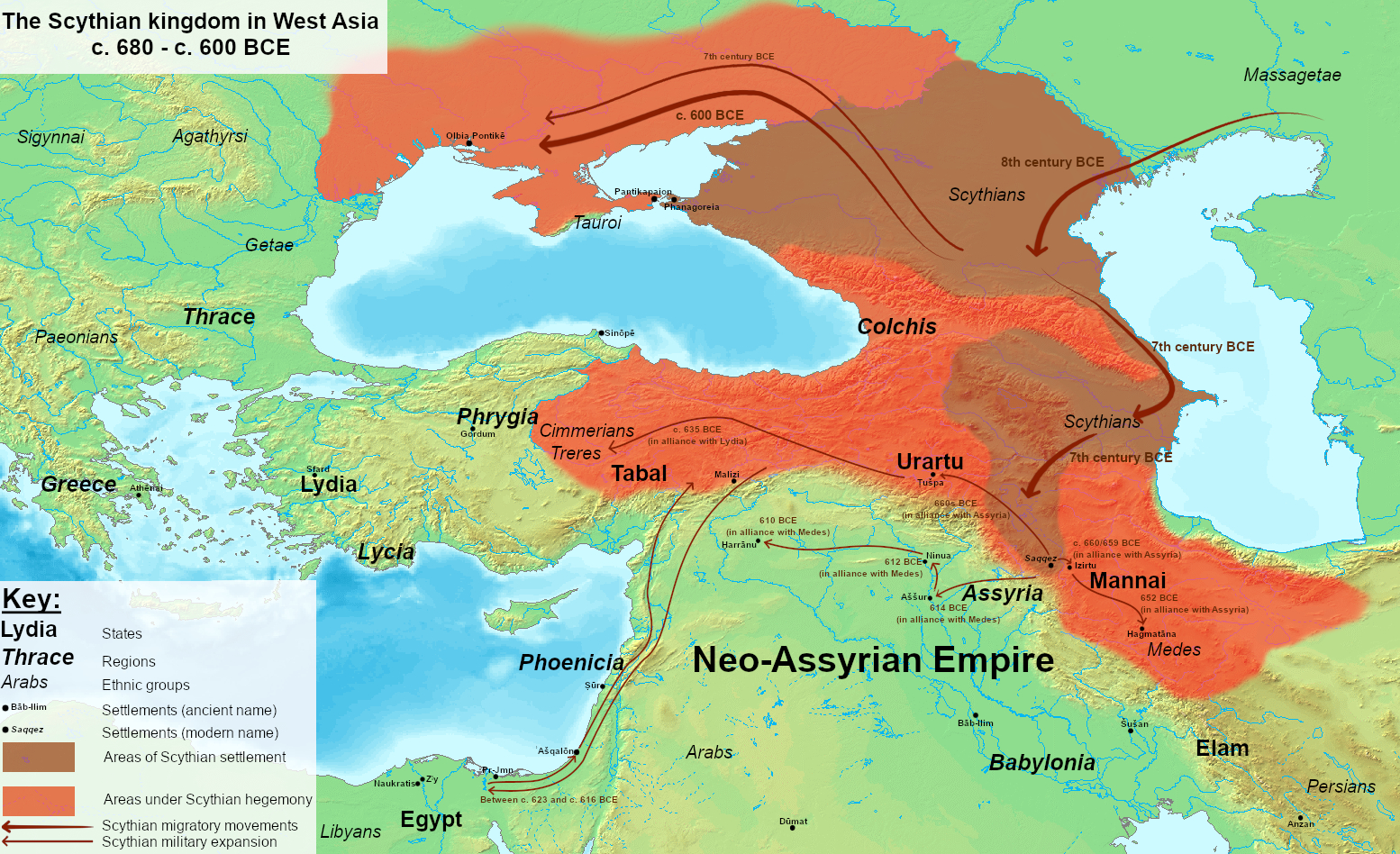
- The maximum extent of the Scythian kingdom in West Asia and surrounding areas

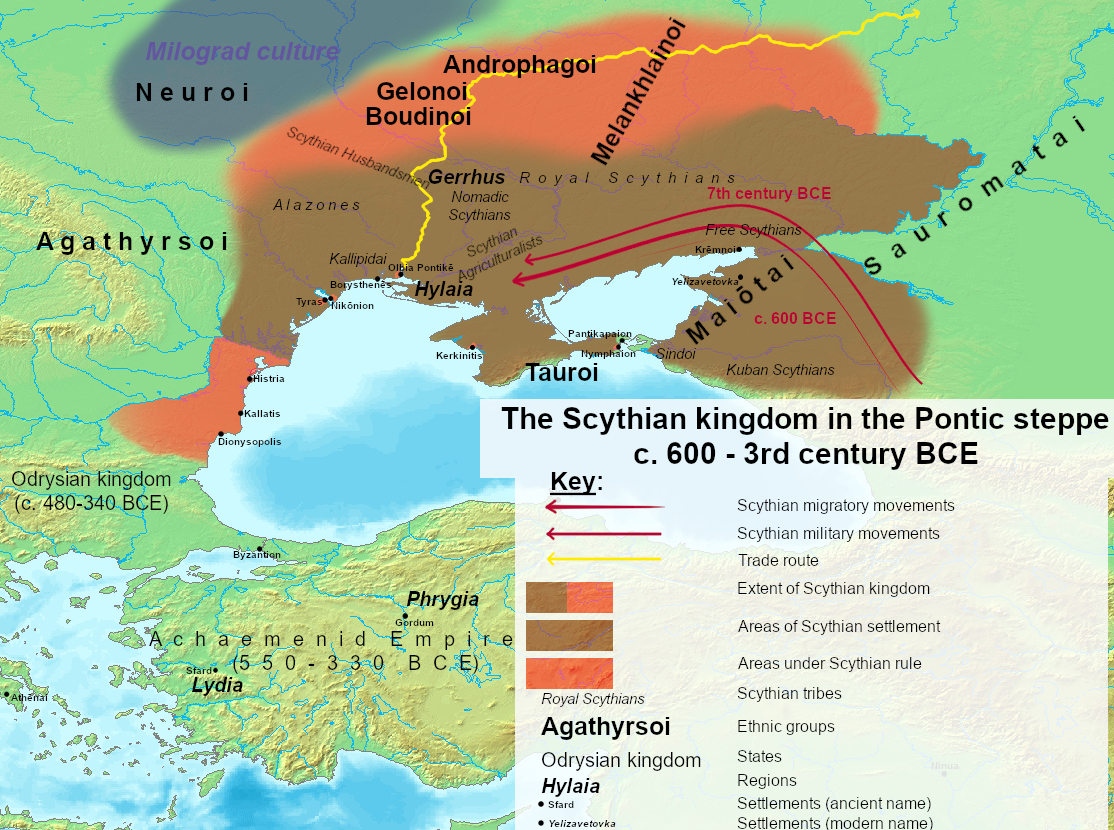
- The maximum extent of the Scythian kingdom in the Pontic steppe
- Location: Central Asia (9th–7th centuries BC); West Asia (7th–6th centuries BC); Pontic Steppe (6th–3rd centuries BC)
- Capital: Kamianka (c. 6th century BC–c. 200 BC)
- Common languages: Scythian
- Religion: Scythian religion
- Demonym: Scythians
- Government: Monarchy
- King
  - unknown–679 BC: Išpakaia
  - 679–c. 665 BC: Bartatua
  - c. 658/9–625 BC: Madyes
  - c. 490–c. 460 BC: Ariapeithes
  - c. 460–c. 450 BC: Scyles
  - c. 450–c. 430 BC: Octamasadas
  - c. 360s–339 BC: Ateas
- History
  - Migration from Central Asia to Caucasian Steppe: c. 9th/8th century BC
  - Alliance with the Neo-Assyrian Empire: c. 672 BC
  - Expulsion from West Asia by Medes: c. 600 BC
  - Persian invasion: 513 BC
  - Sarmatian invasion of Scythia: c. 3rd century BC
Preceded by
Cimmerians
Agathyrsi
Urartu
Mannai
Andronovo culture
Succeeded by
Median Empire
Lydian Empire
Scythian kingdom in Crimea
Scythian kingdom on the lower Danube
Sindica
Sarmatians
Sauromatians
Kingdom of Pontus

The Scythians (/ˈsɪθiən, ˈsɪðiən/) or Scyths (/ˈsɪθs/), also known as the Pontic Scythians, were an ancient Eastern Iranic equestrian nomadic people who migrated during the 9th to 8th centuries BC from Central Asia to the Pontic Steppe in modern-day Ukraine and Southern Russia, where they remained until the 3rd century BC.

Skilled in mounted warfare, the Scythians displaced the Agathyrsi and the Cimmerians as the dominant power on the western Eurasian Steppe in the 8th century BC. In the 7th century BC, the Scythians crossed the Caucasus Mountains and often raided West Asia along with the Cimmerians.

In the 6th century BC, they were expelled from West Asia by the Medes, and retreated back into the Pontic Steppe, and were later conquered by the Sarmatians in the 3rd to 2nd centuries BC. By the 3rd century AD, the remnants of the Scythians were overwhelmed by the Goths, and by the early Middle Ages the last Scythians were assimilated and absorbed by the various successive populations who had moved into the Pontic Steppe during the Migration Period.

After the Scythians' disappearance, authors of the ancient, medieval, and early modern periods used their name to refer to various populations of the steppes unrelated to them.

== Names ==
=== Etymology ===
The name is derived from the Scythian endonym *Skuδa, meaning lit. 'archers' which was derived from the Proto-Indo-European root *(s)kewd-, lit. 'shoot, throw'. This name was semantically similar to the endonym of the Sauromatians, *Sa^{u}rumata, meaning "armed with throwing darts and arrows."

From this earlier term *Skuδa were derived:

- the Akkadian designation of the Scythians:
  - Askuzāya (𒆳𒊍𒆪𒍝𒀀𒀀),
  - Ašguzāya (𒆳𒀾𒄖𒍝𒀀𒀀),
  - Asguzāya (𒌷𒊍𒄖𒍝𒀀𒀀),
  - and Iškuzāya (𒆳𒅖𒆪𒍝𒀀𒀀);
- the Hebrew name *ʾAškūz (*אשכוז), which through a scribal error was corrupted to ʾAškənāz (אַשְׁכְּנָז);
- and the Ancient Greek name Skuthai (Σκύθαι), from which was derived the Latin name Scythae, which in turn gave the English name Scythians.

The Urartian name for the Scythians might possibly have been Išqigulu (𒆳𒅖𒆥𒄖𒇻).

Due to a sound change from /δ/ (/ð/) to /l/ commonly attested in East Iranic language family to which Scythian belonged, the name *Skuδa evolved into *Skula, which was recorded in ancient Greek as Skolotoi (Σκόλοτοι), in which the Greek plural-forming suffix -τοι (-toi) was added to the name. The name of the 5th century BC king Scyles (Ancient Greek: Σκύλης, romanized: Skúlēs) represented this later form, *Skula.

=== Modern terminology ===
==== Scythians proper ====
The name "Scythians" was initially used by ancient authors to designate specifically the Iranic people who lived in the Pontic Steppe between the Danube and the Don rivers.

In modern archaeology, the term "Scythians" is used in its original narrow sense as a name strictly for the Iranic people who lived in the Pontic and Crimean Steppes, between the Danube and Don rivers, from the 7th to 3rd centuries BC.

==== Broader designations ====
By the Hellenistic period, authors such as Hecataeus of Miletus however sometimes extended the designation "Scythians" indiscriminately to all steppe nomads and forest steppe populations living in Europe and Asia, and used it to also designate the Saka of Central Asia.

Early modern scholars tended to follow the lead of the Hellenistic authors in extending the name "Scythians" into a general catch-all term for the various equestrian warrior-nomadic cultures of the Iron Age-period Eurasian Steppe following the discovery in the 1930s in the eastern parts of the Eurasian steppe of items forming the "Scythian triad," consisting of distinctive weapons, horse harnesses, and objects decorated in the "Animal Style" art, which had until then been considered to be markers of the Scythians proper.

This broad use of the term "Scythian" has however been criticised for lumping together various heterogeneous populations belonging to different cultures, and therefore leading to several errors in the coverage of the various warrior-nomadic cultures of the Iron Age-period Eurasian Steppe. Therefore, the narrow use of the term "Scythian" as denoting specifically the people who dominated the Pontic Steppe between the 7th and 3rd centuries BC is preferred by Scythologists such as Askold Ivantchik.

Within this broad use, the Scythians proper who lived in the Pontic Steppes are sometimes referred to as Pontic Scythians.

Modern-day anthropologists instead prefer using the term "Scytho-Siberians" to denote this larger cultural grouping of nomadic peoples living in the Eurasian steppe and forest steppe extending from Central Europe to the limits of the Chinese Zhou Empire, and of which the Pontic Scythians proper were only one section. These various peoples shared the use of the "Scythian triad," that is of distinctive weapons, horse harnesses and the "Animal Style" art.

The term "Scytho-Siberian" has itself in turn also been criticised since it is sometimes used broadly to include all Iron Age equestrian nomads, including those who were not part of any Scythian or Saka. The scholars Nicola Di Cosmo and Andrzej Rozwadowski instead prefer the use of the term "Early Nomadic" for the broad designation of the Iron Age horse-riding nomads.

==== Saka ====
While the ancient Persians used the name Saka to designate all the steppe nomads and specifically referred to the Pontic Scythians as Sakā tayaiy paradraya (𐎿𐎣𐎠 𐏐 𐎫𐎹𐎡𐎹 𐏐 𐎱𐎼𐎭𐎼𐎹; lit. 'the Saka who dwell beyond the (Black) Sea'), the name "Saka" is used in modern scholarship to designate the Iranic pastoralist nomads who lived in the steppes of Central Asia and East Turkestan in the 1st millennium BC.

==== Cimmerians ====
The Late Babylonian scribes of the Achaemenid Empire used the name "Cimmerians" to designate all the nomad peoples of the steppe, including the Scythians and Saka.

However, while the Cimmerians were an Iranic people sharing a common language, origins and culture with the Scythians and are archaeologically indistinguishable from the Scythians, all sources contemporary to their activities clearly distinguished the Cimmerians and the Scythians as being two separate political entities.

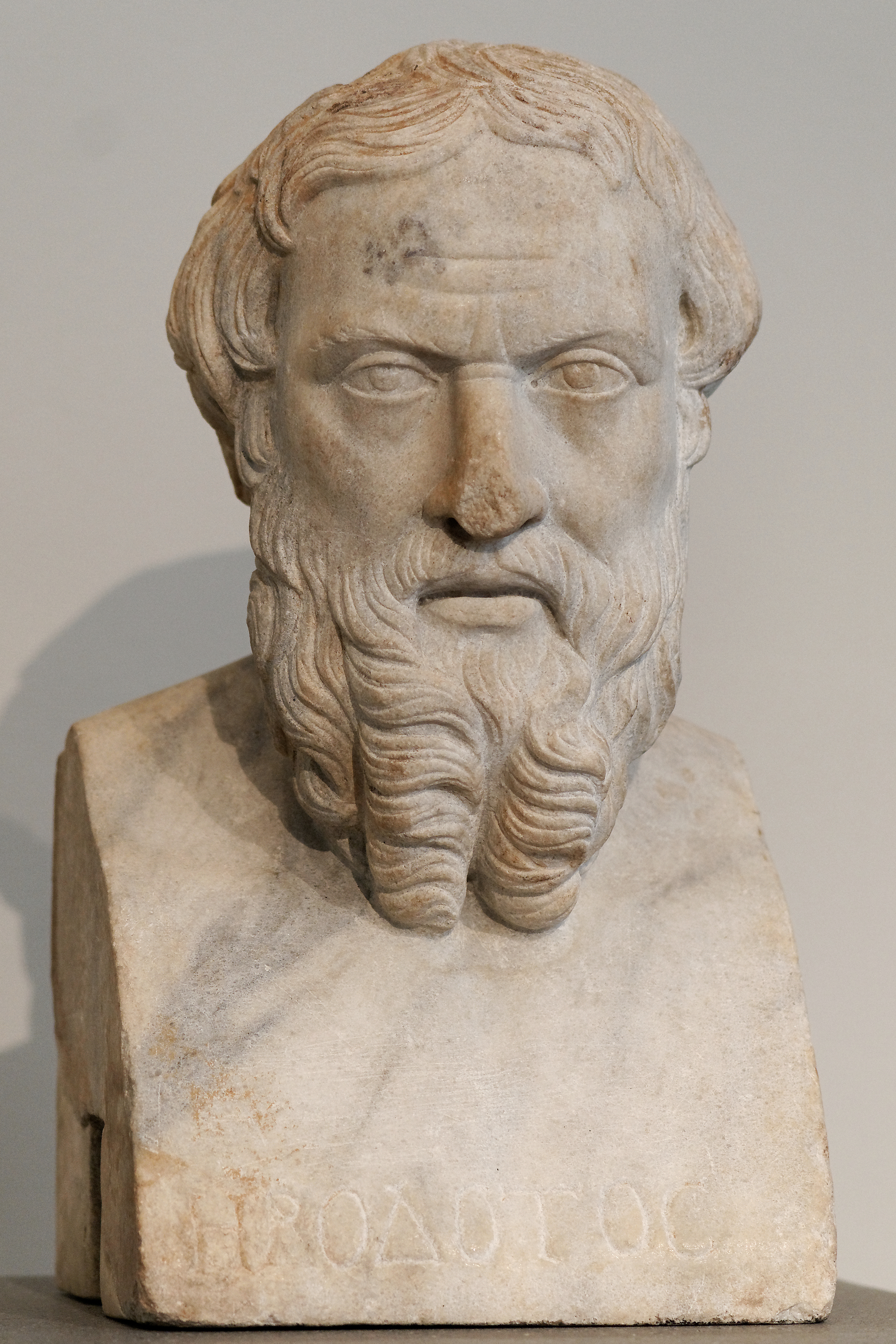
The 5th-century BC Greek historian Herodotus of Halicarnassus is the most important literary source on the origins of the Scythians

== History ==
There are two main sources of information on the historical Scythians:

- Akkadian cuneiform texts from Mesopotamia which deal with early Scythian history from the 7th century BC;
- and Graeco-Roman sources which cover all of Scythian history, most prominently those written by Herodotus of Halicarnassus, which are less reliable because the information they contain is mixed with folk tales and learnt constructs of historians.

=== Proto-Scythian period ===
Aržan kurgan (8-7th century BC)
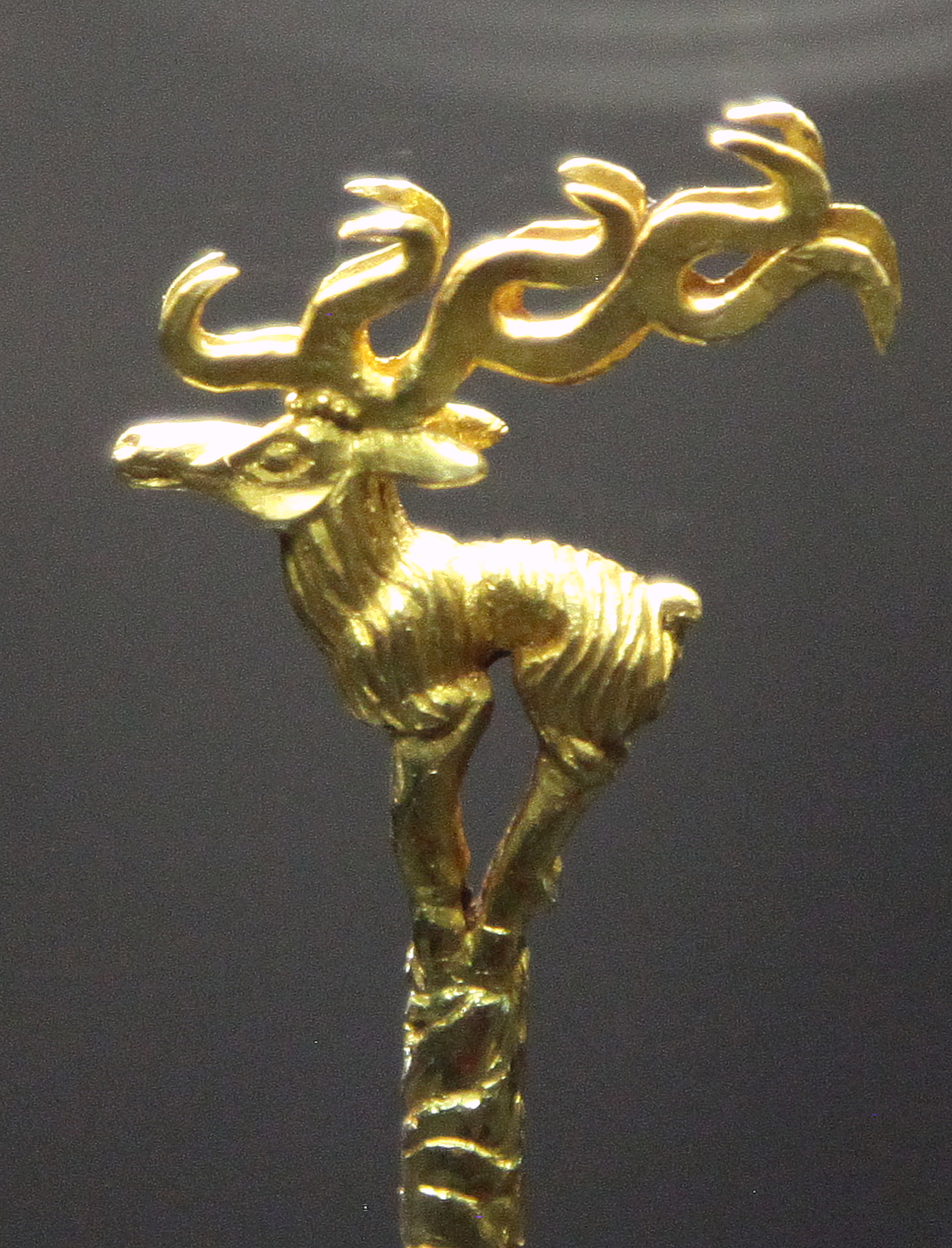
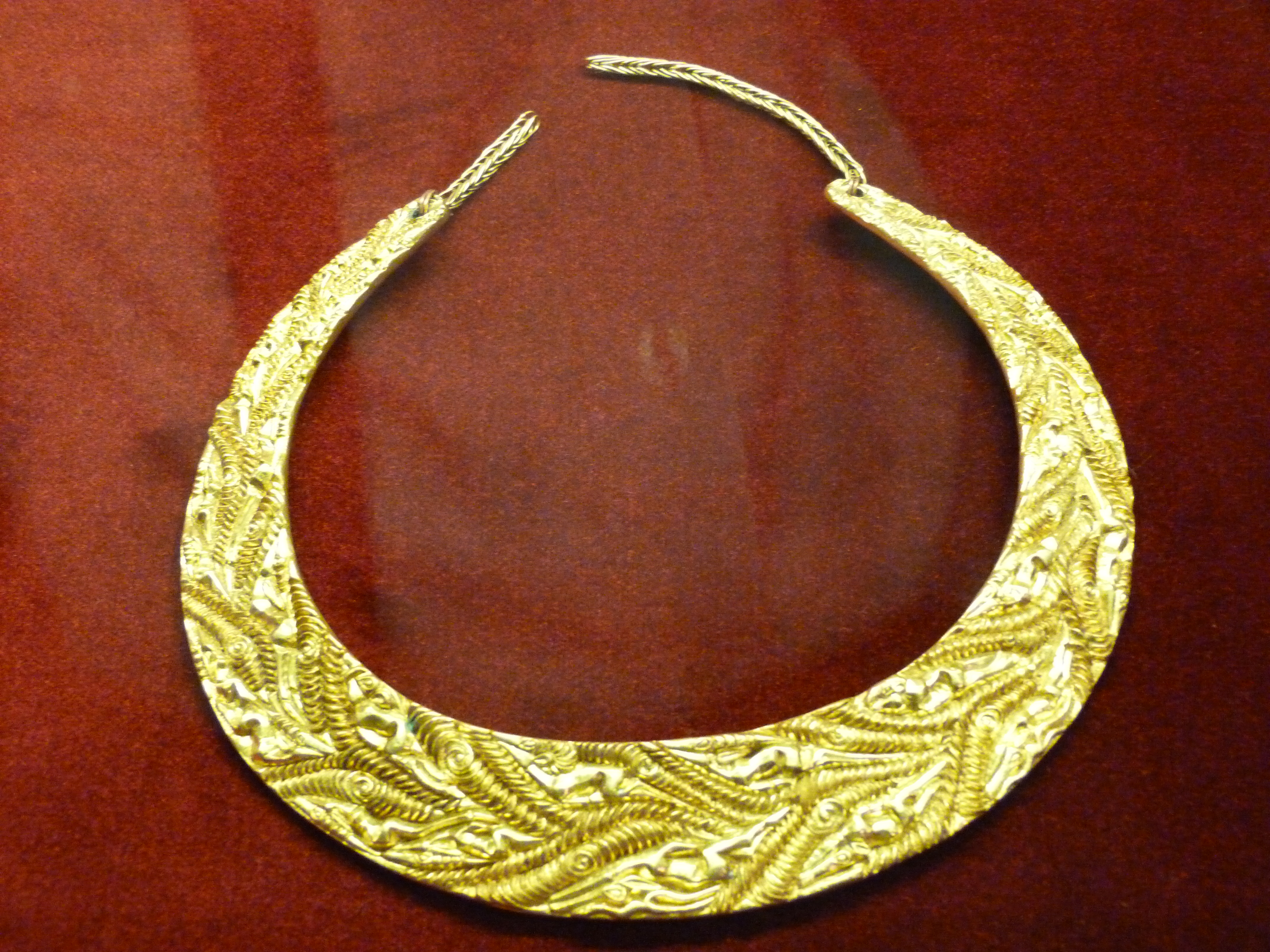
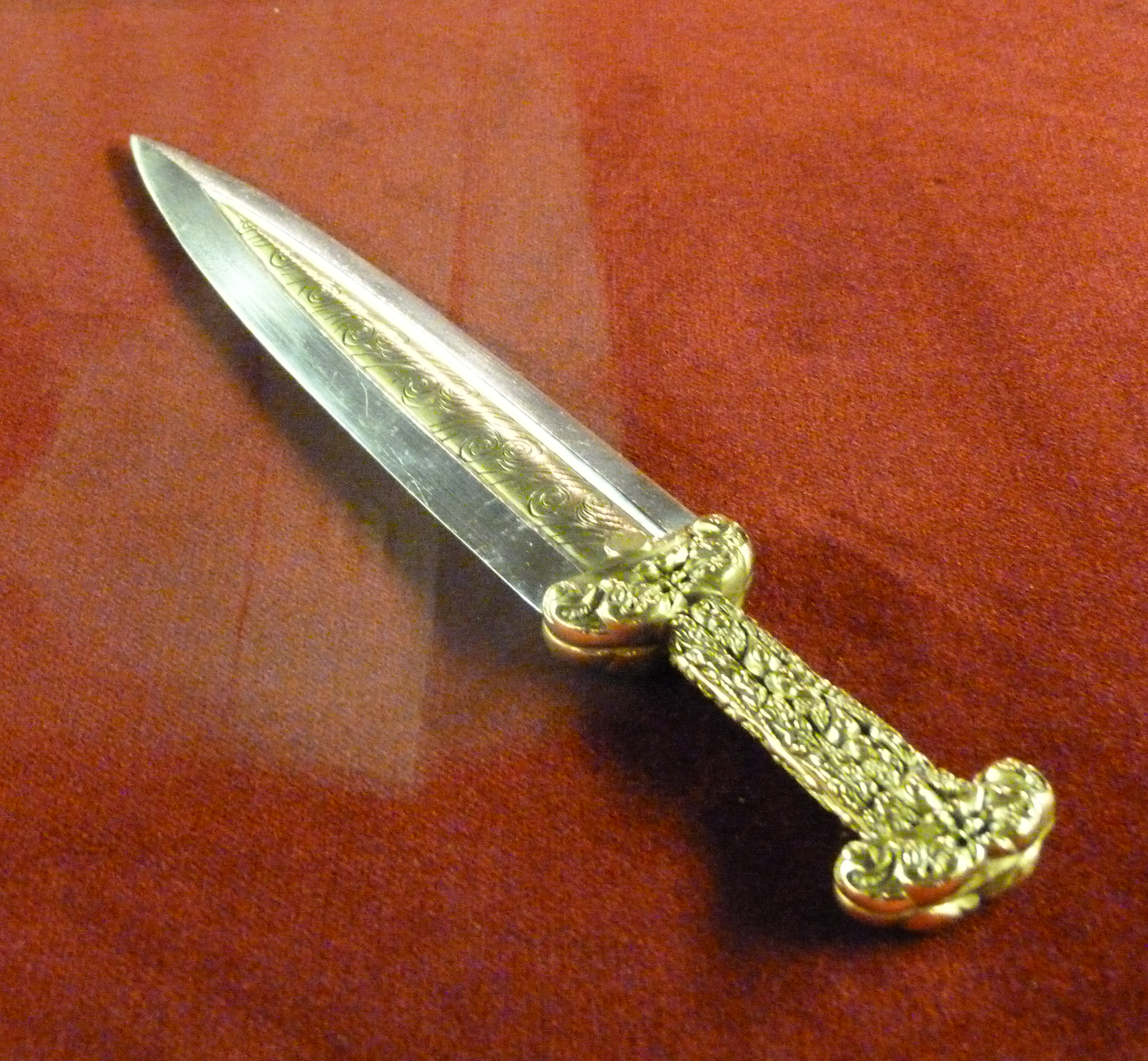
Some of the earliest Scythian artefacts in Animal style, Aržan kurgan, Southern Siberia, dated to 8-7th century BC.

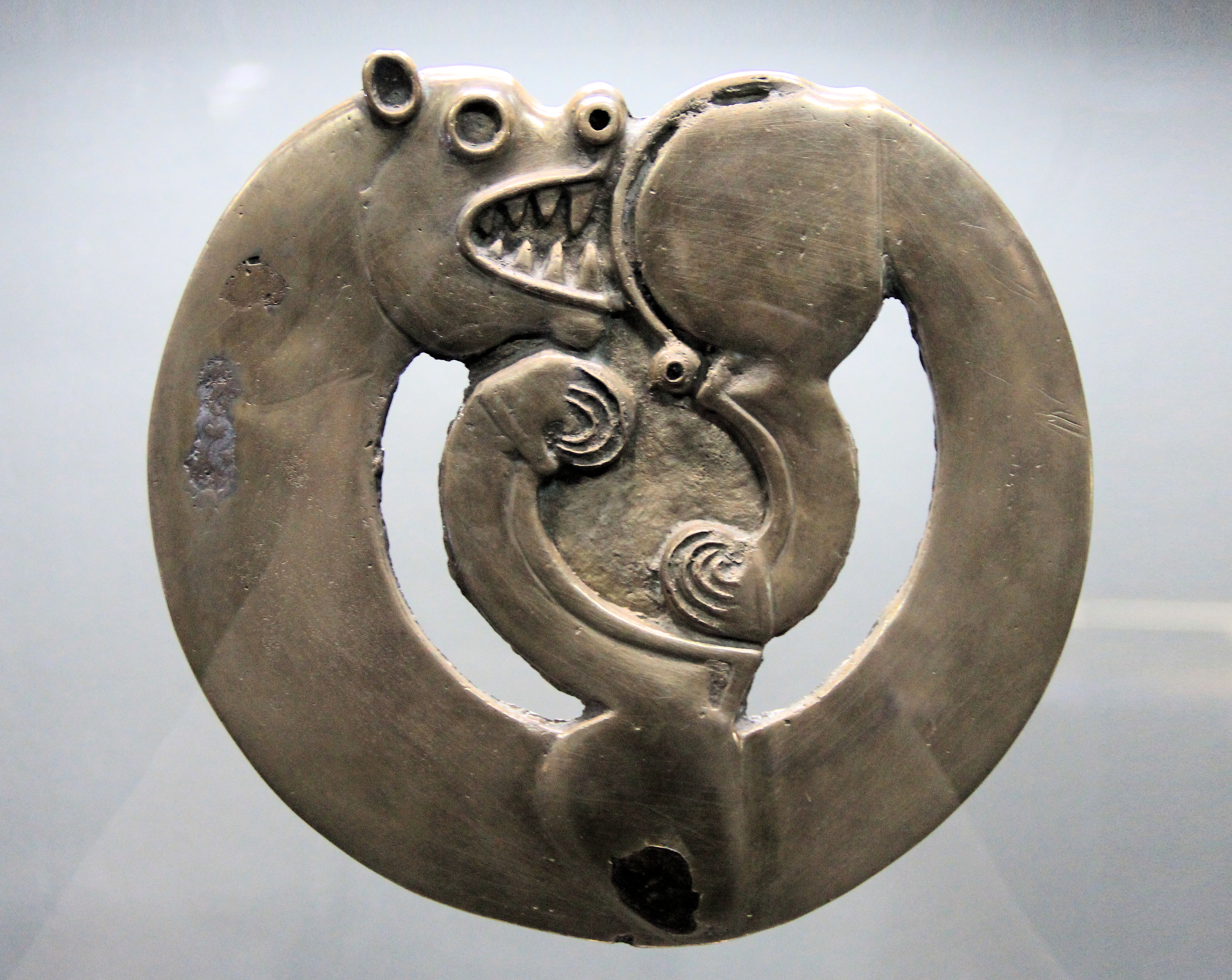
Curled-up feline animal from Aržan-1, circa 800 BC.

The arrival of the Scythians in Europe was part of the larger movement of Central Asian Iranic nomads, including Cimmerians, Sauromatians, and Sarmatians, westwards towards Southeast and Central Europe from the 1st millennium BC to the 1st millennium AD.

Like the nomads of the Chernogorovka-Novocherkassk complex, the Scythians originated, along with the Early Sakas, in Central Asia and Siberia in the steppes corresponding to either present-day eastern Kazakhstan or the Altai-Sayan region. The Scythians were already acquainted with quality goldsmithing and sophisticated bronze-casting at this time, as attested by gold pieces found in the 8th century BC Aržan-1 kurgan.

==== Migration out of Central Asia ====
The second wave of migration of Iranic nomads corresponded to the early Scythians' arrival from Central Asia into the Caucasian Steppe, which begun in the 9th century BC, when a significant movement of the nomadic peoples of the Eurasian Steppe started after the early Scythians were expelled from Central Asia by either the Massagetae, who were a powerful nomadic Iranic tribe from Central Asia closely related to them, or by another Central Asian people called the Issedones, forcing the early Scythians to the west, across the Araxes river and into the Caspian and Ciscaucasian Steppes.

This western migration of the early Scythians lasted through the middle 8th century BC, and archaeologically corresponded to the westward movement of a population originating from Tuva in southern Siberia in the late 9th century BC, and arriving in the 8th to 7th centuries BC into Europe, especially into Ciscaucasia, which it reached some time between c. 750 and c. 700 BC, thus following the same migration path as the first wave of Iranic nomads of the Chernogorovka-Novocherkassk complex.

==== Displacement of the Cimmerians ====
The Scythians' westward migration brought them in the 7th century BC to the Caspian Steppe, occupied by the Cimmerians since the 10th century BC as part of the first westward wave of proto-Scythian migrations. Around this time, the Cimmerians left the steppe and crossed the Caucasus into West Asia. This may have been due to pressure from the Scythians, but they arrived in West Asia about 40 years before the Scythians and evidence is lacking of pressure or conflict between them in later Graeco-Roman accounts.

Thus dominance in the Caspian Steppe transferred from Cimmerians to Scythians. Remaining Cimmerians were assimilated by the Scythians, which was facilitated by their similar ethnic backgrounds and lifestyles. Later, the Scythians settled the Ciscaucasian Steppe where they established their capital, between the Araxes river to the east, the Caucasus Mountains to the south, and the Maeotian Sea to the west.

The arrival and establishment of the Scythians corresponds to a disturbance of the development and a replacement of the Cimmerian peoples' Chernogorovka-Novocherkassk complex during c. 750 to c. 600 BC in southern Europe. Nevertheless, early Scythian culture had links to the Chernogorovka-Novocherkassk complex. Also, Scythian culture shows links to the older Bronze Age Timber Grave culture in the north Pontic region, including elements of funerary rituals, ceramics, horse gear, and some weapon types.

=== Early period ===
==== Ciscaucasian kingdom ====
After their initial westwards migrations, and from around c. 750 BC, the Scythians settled in the Ciscaucasian Steppe between the Araxes river to the east, the Caucasus mountains to the south, and the Maeotian Sea to the west. They concentrated in the valley of the Kuban river, where they established their capital until the end of the 7th century BC. Initially, they were few and occupied a small area of Ciscaucasia. This would remain the centre of the Scythian kingdom and culture until around c. 600 BC.

The Scythians extracted tribute from the native Koban and Maeotian populations of Ciscaucasia, such as agricultural, clay and bronze goods, weapons and horse equipment. Maeotians provided large wide-necked pots, jugs, mugs, and small basins. Through the 8th and 7th centuries BC, these interactions and assimilation led to a mixed culture.

==== West Asia ====
During the latter 8th and the 7th centuries BC, equestrian nomads beginning with the Cimmerians expanded from Ciscaucasia southwards across the Caucasus Mountains to West Asia. They were taking advantage of the social disruption caused by the growth of the Neo-Assyrian Empire in West Asia.

Surrounding polities were:

- Phrygia and Lydia in Anatolia;
- Babylon and Elam in the south;
- Egypt in the southwest;
- Urartu in the north;
- the weaker states of Ellipi and Mannai in the east;
- and the city-states of the Medes, who were an Iranic people of West Asia to whom the Scythians and Cimmerians were distantly related.

Like local rulers, Scythians and Cimmerians negotiated for their interests by vacillating between these powers. and served as mercenaries.

Small nomad groups from Ciscaucasia might have acted in West Asia since the 9th century BC, which laid the ground for the larger migrations. The migration of the Scythians was not directly connected to that of the Cimmerians. Scythians became active there after arriving in Transcaucasia around c. 700 BC, and maintained contact with the Scythian kingdom in Ciscaucasia.

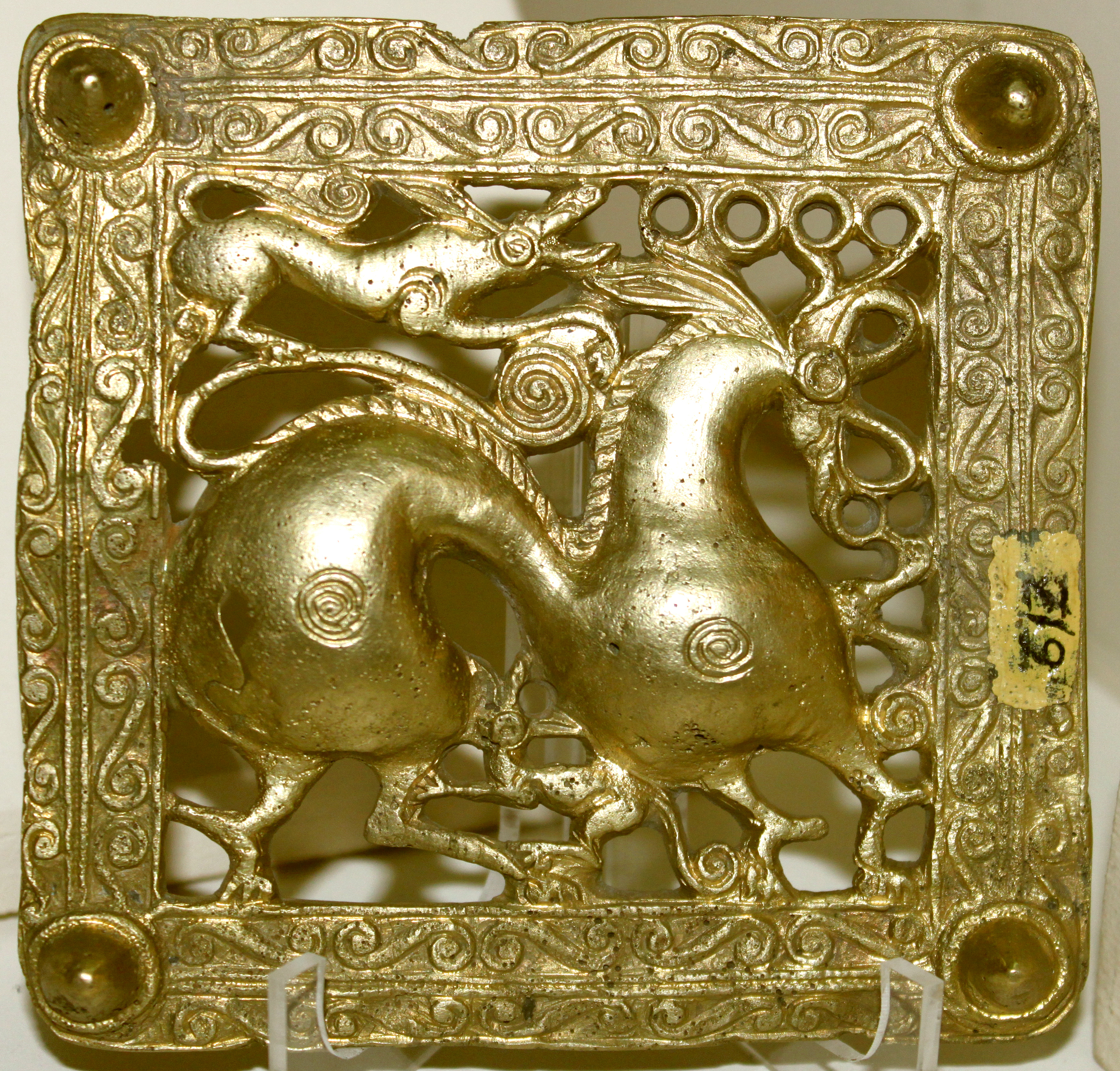
Gold Scythian belt title, Mingəçevir (ancient Scythian kingdom), Azerbaijan, 7th-4th century BC

In West Asia, the Scythians settled eastern Transcaucasia and the northwest Iranian plateau, in today's Azerbaijan, which became their centre until c. 600 BC. Akkadian sources from Mesopotamia called this "land of the Scythians" (𒆳𒅖𒆪𒍝𒀀𒀀, māt Iškuzaya). Unlike Cimmerians, the Scythians there remained a single polity. Local craftsmen became their suppliers.

===== Initial activities in West Asia =====
The Scythian and Cimmerian movements into Anatolia and the Iranian Plateau would act as catalysts for the adoption of Eurasian nomadic military and equestrian equipments by various West Asian states: it was during the 7th and 6th centuries BCE that "Scythian-type" socketed arrowheads and sigmoid bows ideal for use by mounted warriors were adopted throughout West Asia.

The Mannaean king Aḫšeri (r. c. 675 – c. 650 BC) welcomed the Cimmerians and the Scythians as useful allies against the Neo-Assyrian Empire. During the reign of the Neo-Assyrian king Esarhaddon (r. 681 – 669 BC), the Scythians acted in with Mannai and Media; their first known mention in Neo-Assyrian records is in c. 680 BC. Around this time, Aḫšēri hindered Neo-Assyrian operations between its own territory and Mannai. The Scythians even attacked distant Neo-Assyrian provinces, and on one occasion core territories.

Between c. 680 and c. 677 BC, Neo-Assyrian king Esarhaddon, retaliated deep into Median territory. The first known Scythian king Išpakāya was killed. His successor Bartatua might have immediately negotiated with whom Esarhaddon. By 672 BC, Bartatua had asked to marry Esarhaddon's eldest daughter Šērūʾa-ēṭirat. Thus Scythia in West Asia became a vassal and nominal extension of Assyria and would remain so.

The eastern Cimmerians soon left the Iranian Plateau westwards for Anatolia.

Without the alliance with the Cimmerians and Scythians, Mannai was weaker. Thus between 660 and 659 BC Esarhaddon's successor Ashurbanipal (r. 669 – 631 BC) attacked Mannai. Bartatua, acted as an intermediary and annexed Mannai into the Scythian kingdom. After this, the centre of Scythian power in West Asia shifted to Sakez near Lake Urmia, where fertile pastures allowed the Scythians to rea large herds of horses.

===== West Asian influences on the Scythians =====
The marital alliance, as well as the proximity of the Scythians to Assyrian-influenced states, placed the Scythians under the strong influence of Assyrian culture. Scythian culture and art absorbed various West Asian elements; Scythian dress and armour from this time, including in Cirscaucasia, reflect heavy influences from West Asia and the Iranian Plateau on Scythian culture during this period.

Scythian rulers began emulating West Asian kings by using luxury goods as status markers. the spoils acquired by the Scythians as diplomatic presents or as plunder was used to enhance their status back in the Ciscaucasian Steppe. In addition, artistic concepts also enhanced the range of the craftsmen serving the Scythian aristocracy: the Scythians had absorbed West Asian tastes and customs such as the concept of the divine origin of royal power, and as their material culture was absorbing West Asian elements, so was their art absorbing West Asian artistic modes of representing these.

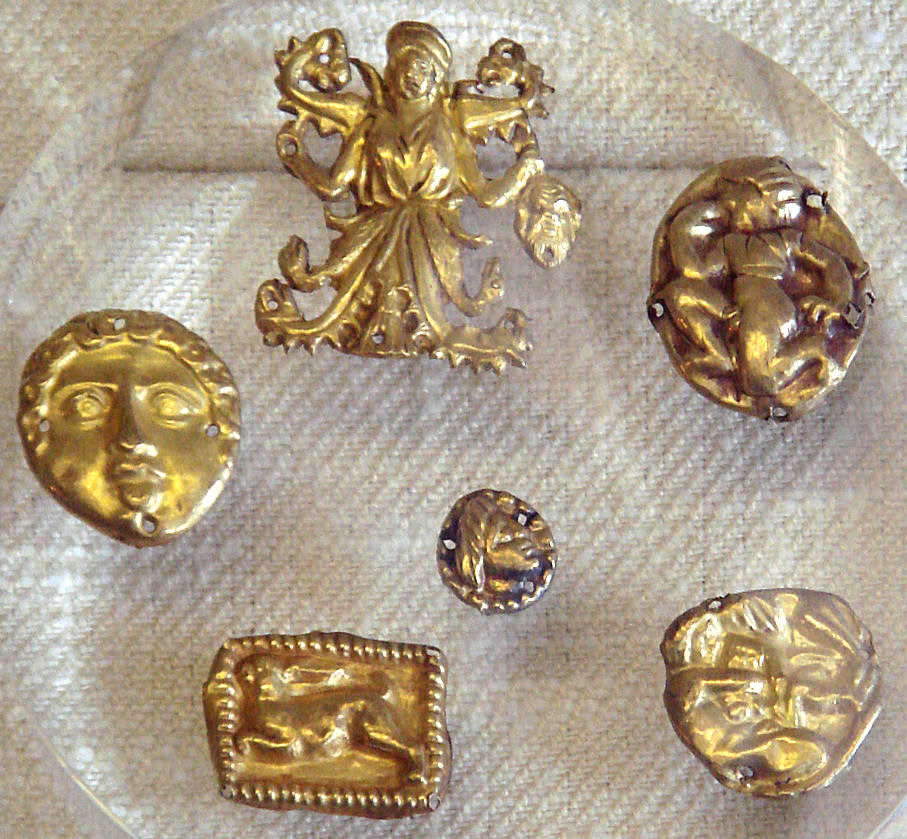
The Scythian Snake-Legged Goddess and other artifacts, from Kul-Oba.

Even West Asian horses were imported to Ciscaucasia. It was also only when the Scythians expanded into West Asia that they became acquainted with iron smelting and forging, before which they were still a Bronze Age society until the late 8th century BC. The Scythians also borrowed the use of the war chariots and of scale armour from West Asians, and Scythian warriors themselves obtained iron weapons and military experience during their stay in West Asia. Within the Scythian religion, the goddess Artimpasa and the Snake-Legged Goddess were significantly influenced by the Mesopotamian and Syro-Canaanite religions.

===== Reign of Madyes =====
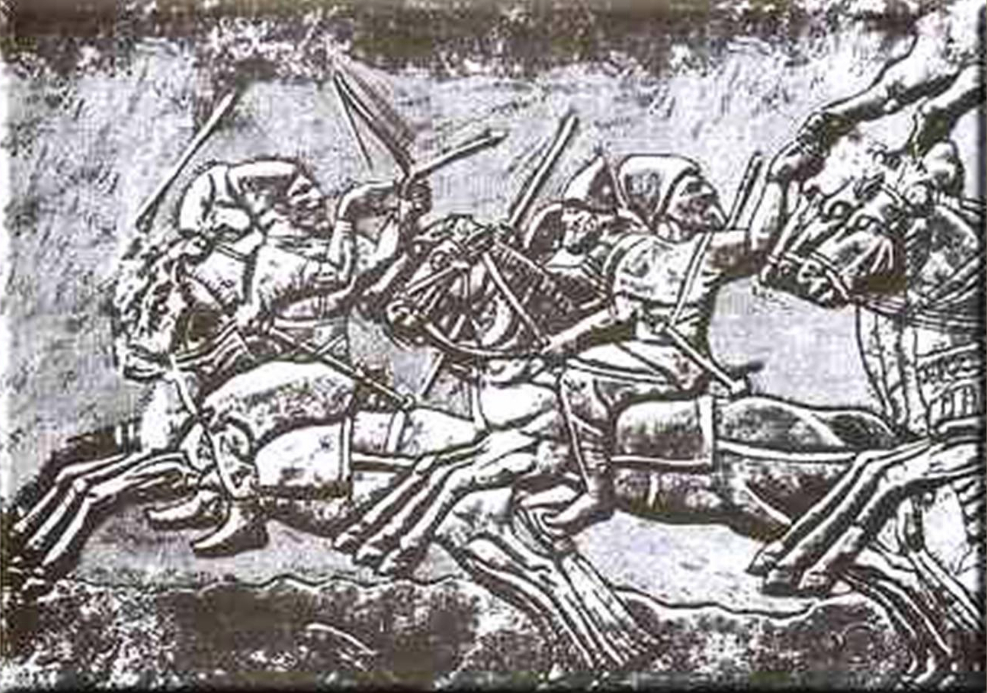
An Assyrian relief depicting Cimmerian mounted warriors

Bartatua was succeeded by his son with Šērūʾa-ēṭirat, Madyes. In 652 BC, Ashurbanipal's eldest brother Šamaš-šuma-ukin, the king of Babylon, rebelled against him. although Ashurbanipal was able to suppress the Babylonian rebellion by 648 BC, the Neo-Assyrian Empire was worn out by this crisis. Madyes helped Ashurbanipal repress the revolt by imposing Scythian hegemony on Media, which marked the beginning of a nearly 30-year long period of Scythian hegemony in West Asia.

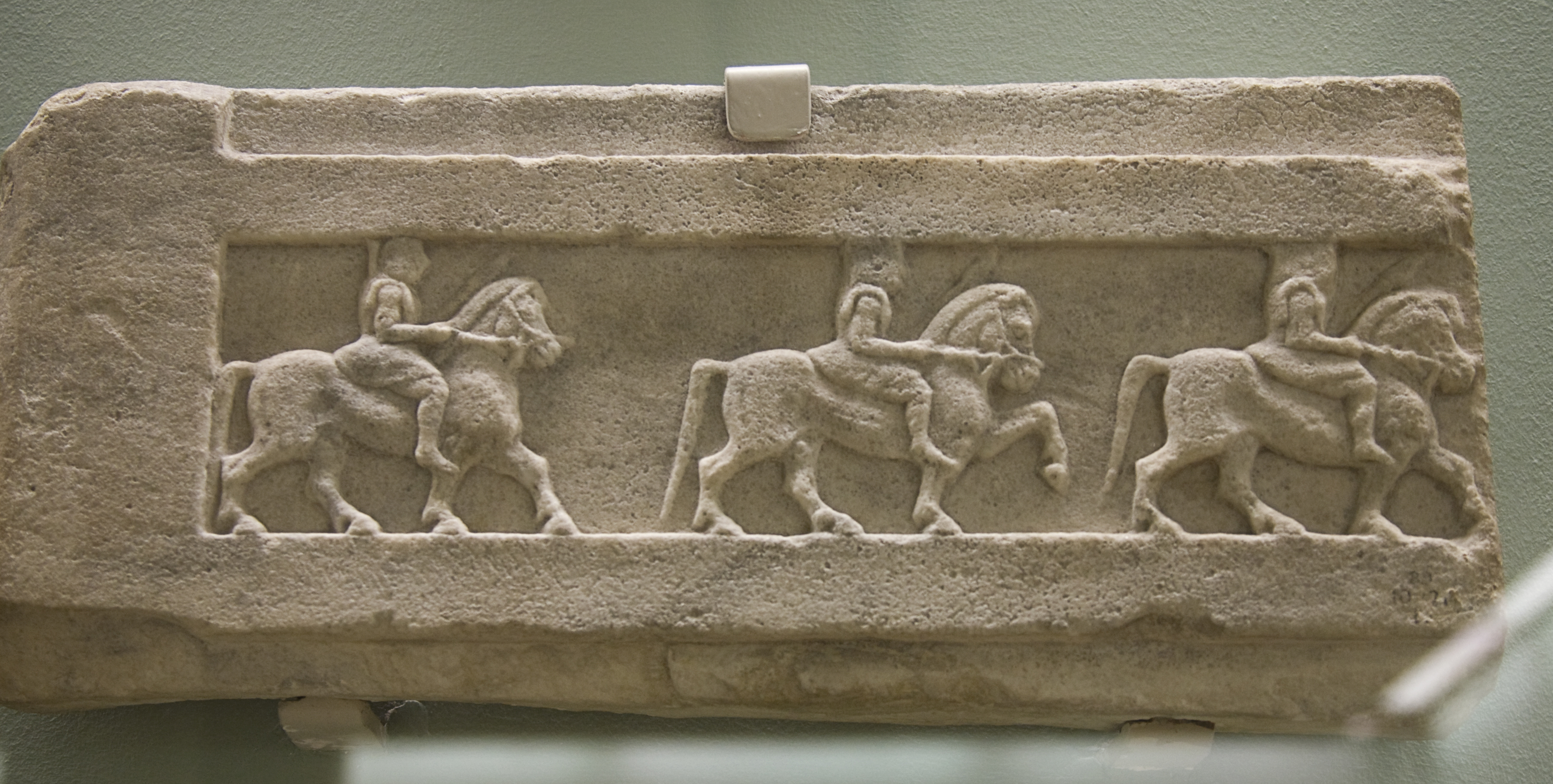
A relief depicting mounted Lydian warriors on slab of marble from a tomb

During the 7th century BC, the bulk of the Cimmerians were operating in Anatolia. The disturbances they caused led to many of the rulers of this region to break away from Neo-Assyrian overlordship, by the time of Ashurbanipal. In 644 BC, the Cimmerians and their allies the Treres defeated the Lydians and captured their capital city of Sardis. Despite this and other setbacks, the Lydian kingdom was able to grow in power. Around c. 635 BC, and with Neo-Assyrian approval, the Scythians under Madyes conquered Urartu, entered Central Anatolia and defeated the Cimmerians alongside the Lydians.

Scythian power in West Asia thus reached its peak under Madyes, with the territories ruled by the Scythian kingdom extending from the Halys river in Anatolia in the west to the Caspian Sea and the eastern borders of Media in the east, and from Transcaucasia in the north to the northern borders of the Neo-Assyrian Empire in the south. Meanwhile, the new Lydian Empire became the dominant power of Anatolia.

===== Decline in West Asia =====
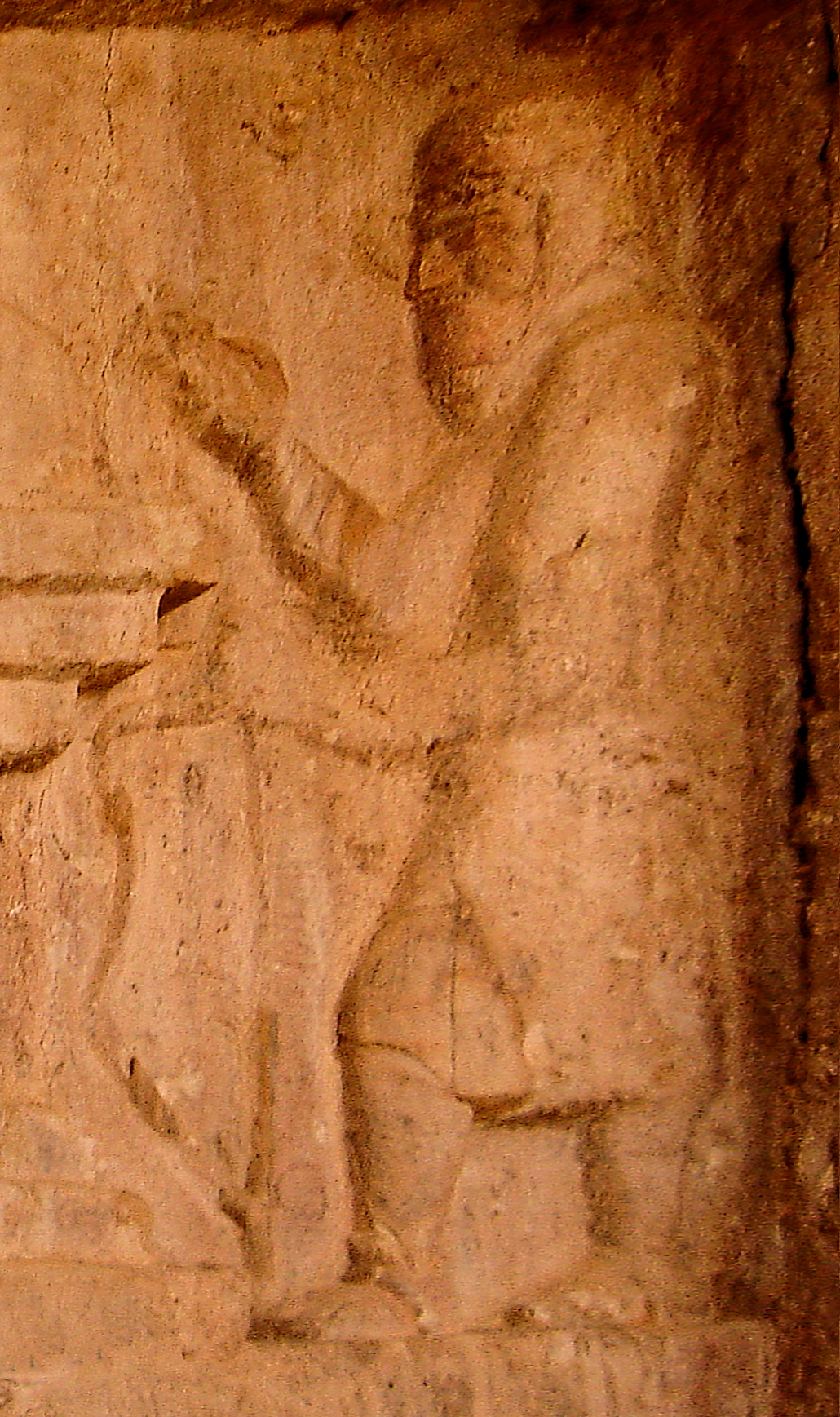
The Median king Cyaxares

The Neo-Assyrian Empire began unravelling after the death of Ashurbanipal because of civil wars under his successors Aššur-etil-ilāni (r. 631 – 627 BC) and Sîn-šar-iškun (r. 627 – 612 BC). In 625 BC, the Median king Cyaxares invited the Scythian leaders to a feast, where he assassinated them all, thus overthrowing the Assyro-Scythian yoke. Cyaxares combined Scythian and Neo-Assyrian military practices to transform Media into the dominant power of the Iranian Plateau. Other vassals of the Neo-Assyrian Empire started breaking away.

Nevertheless, the Scythians took advantage of the temporary power vacuum to raid into the Levant some time between c. 626 and c. 616 BC. It is unknown whether this raid damaged the hold of the Neo-Assyrian Empire on its western provinces. The raid reached as far south as Palestine, but did not affect the kingdom of Judah. It reached the borders of the Saite Egyptian kingdom, but pharaoh Psamtik I turn them back by offering them gifts. The retreating Scythians sacked several cities in Palestine. Later Scythian activities were limited to the eastern border of Neo-Assyria and the importation of West Asian goods into the Ciscaucasian steppe.

By 615, Scythia was an ally of Cyaxares in his war against the Neo-Assyrian Empire, possibly out of necessity. Scythia supported the Medo-Babylonian conquests of Aššur in 614 BC, of Nineveh in 612 BC, and of the last Neo-Assyrian remnants at Ḫarran in 610 BC, which permanently destroyed the Neo-Assyrian Empire.

By the c. 590s BC, the ascending Median Empire of Cyaxares annexed Urartu, after having annexed Mannai in 616 BC. This rise of Median power forced the Scythians to leave West Asia and retreat north to the Ciscaucasian Steppe. Nevertheless, they continued complex relations with the Median kingdom.

Some splinter Scythian groups remained in eastern Transcaucasia. Later Graeco-Roman sources claimed that these Scythians left the Median kingdom and fled into the Lydian Empire, beginning a conflict between Lydia and Media: These Scythians who had remained in West Asia had been completely assimilated into Median society and state by the mid-6th century BC.

==== Initial Greek interactions ====
Since the 8th century BC, ancient Greeks ventured in the Black Sea. Encounters with friendly natives led them to found trading settlements (Ancient Greek: ἐμπόρια, romanized: empória; Latin: emporia). The earliest emporia of the north Black Sea were at Histria, Tyras, and especially on the island of Borysthenēs. Pontic Steppe Scythians came encountered Greek settlers from Miletus on the Scythian-ruled northern Black Sea coast around c. 625 BC. Trade and settlement were largely peaceful.

From these settlements, Scythian aristocracy bought luxury goods, especially wine and vessels to mix and drink it, and even used those as grave goods. Greek colonists made gold and electrum items for Scythians. After Scythian activity in West Asia declined in the c. 620s BC, ties with the Greek colonies grew, and the Scythians started buying pottery imported from the Aegean islands. Greek influences on the Scythians replaced West Asian ones from the beginning of the 6th century BC.

==== Pontic Steppe ====
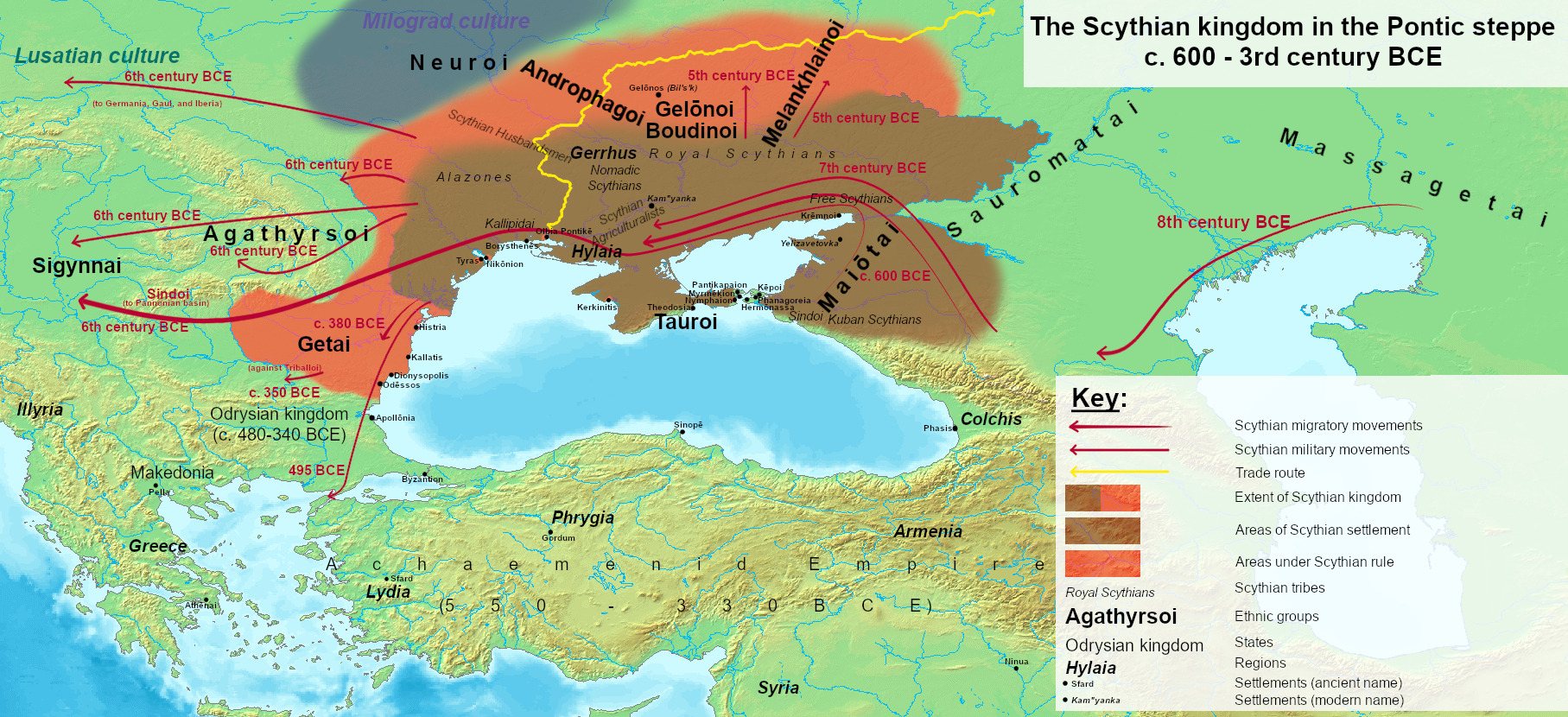
The Scythian kingdom in the Pontic steppe at its maximum extent in the 6th century BC

During the 8th to 7th centuries BC, the Scythians conquered the Pontic and Crimean Steppes, but few settled there until they were expelled from West Asia. This was motivated by the threat of the Median Empire to the south of Ciscaucasia, and by the wealthy Greek colonies on the Black Sea coast. The Scythian kingdom traded between the Greek colonies to their south and the forest steppe to their north, via large rivers.

The Scythians ruled as elites over the local populations and assimilated them into a tribal identity while allowing them to continue their lifestyles and economic organisations. Thus, the area became called Scythia, and many ethnically non-Scythian peoples were called "Scythians".

==== Campaigns from the Pontic Steppe ====
The Scythians introduced to the north Pontic region articles originating in the Siberian Karasuk culture, such as distinctive swords and daggers, and which were characteristic of early Scythian archaeological culture, consisting of cast bronze cauldrons, daggers, swords, and horse harnesses. Those early Scythian designs had been influenced by Chinese art; for example, the "cruciform tubes" used to fix strap-crossings were first created by Shang artisans. The metallurgical workshops for Scythian weapons and horse equipment were located in the forest steppe.

At this time, the Scythians introduced iron working from West Asia to the Bronze-Age peoples of the Pontic Steppe. The Scythian establishment in the Pontic Steppe was especially facilitated by the iron weapons and the military experience they obtained in West Asia, for example scale armour used by Scythian aristocracy.

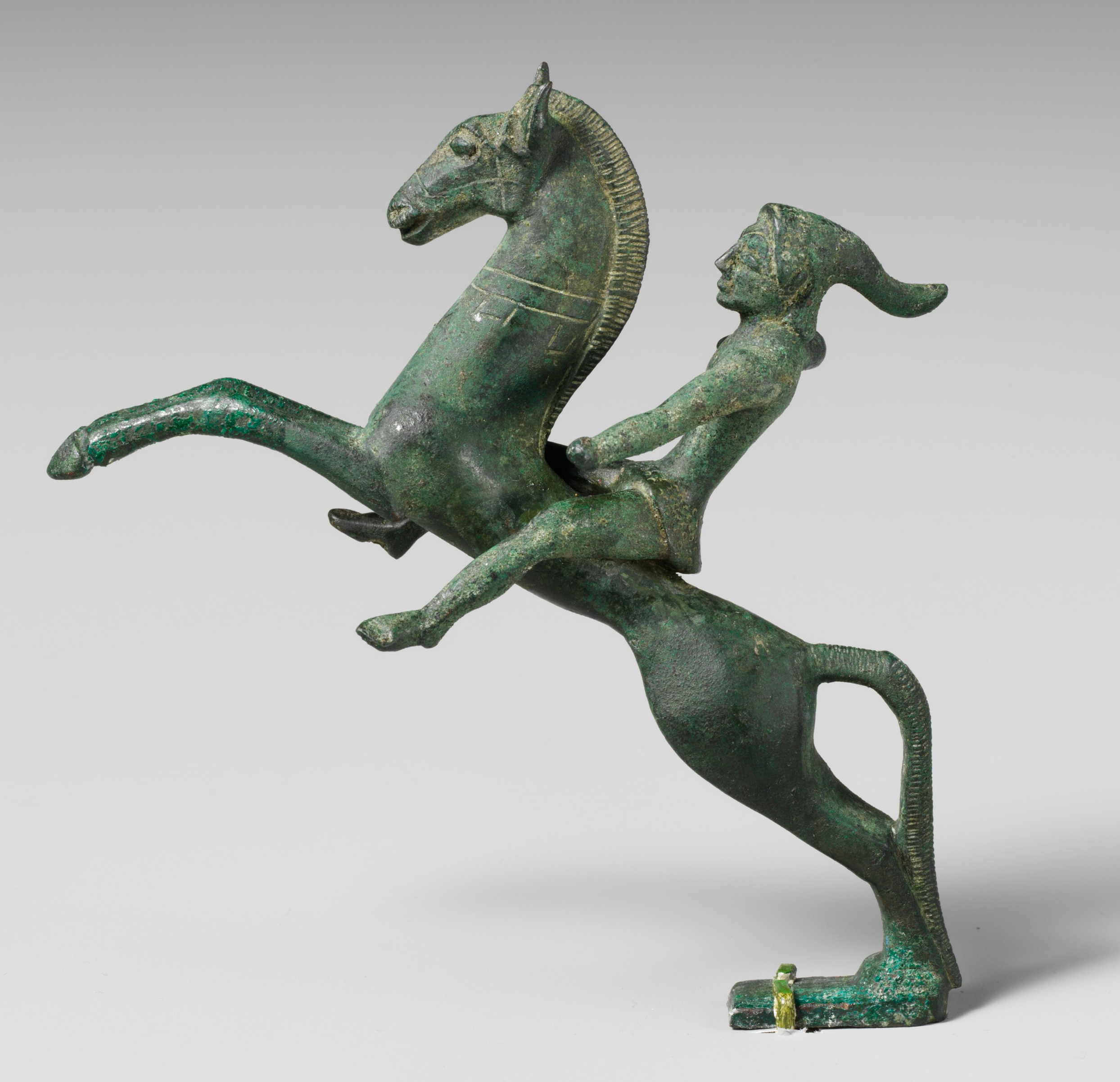
Scythian mounted archer, Etruscan art, early 5th century BC.

After the centre of Scythian power shifted to the Pontic Steppe, from around c. 600 BC the Scythians often raided adjacent regions such as central and southeast Europe: Transylvania, Podolia the Pannonian Steppe, southern Germania, Lusatian culture (causing its destruction), Gaul, and possibly even the Iberian peninsula. They destroyed multiple Lusatian settlements. Scythian arrowheads were found in today's Poland and Slovakia, such as at Witaszkowo, Wicina, Strzegom, Polanowice, and Smolenice-Molpír. The Scythians destroyed many important Iron-Age settlements north and south of the Moravian Gate and ones of the eastern Hallstatt culture. For example, Scythian-type arrows were found at the Smolenice-Molpír fortified hillfort's access points at the gate and the south-west side of the acropolis. From the 7th century BC, the Scythians attacked forest steppe tribes in the East European forest steppe to the north, who built many fortified settlements to repel these attacks. Overall, these incursions were similar to those of the Huns and the Avars during the Migration Period, and of the Mongols in the mediaeval era, and were recorded in Etruscan bronze figurines depicting mounted Scythian archers.

===== Foreign pressures =====
Meanwhile, in West Asia, the Neo-Babylonian, Median, Lydian empires had been replaced during c. 550 to c. 539 BC by the Achaemenid Empire, founded by Cyrus II of the Persians, who were a West Asian Iranic people distantly related to the Scythians. The Achaemenid Empire forced the Scythians to stay north of the Caucasus.

The establishment of the Pontic Scythian kingdom stimulated the development of extensive trade connections. After the bulk of the Scythians moved into the Pontic Steppe, permanent Greek colonies were founded there: the second wave of Greek colonisation of the north coast of the Black Sea, which started soon after c. 600 BC, involved the formation of settlements possessing agricultural lands (Ancient Greek: χῶραι, romanized: khôrai) for migrants from Miletus, Corinth, Phocaea and Megara seeking to establishing themselves to farm (Ancient Greek: ἀποικίαι, romanized: apoikíai) in these regions where the land was fertile and the sea was plentiful. The contacts between the Scythians and the Greeks led to the formation of a mixed Graeco-Scythian culture, such as among the "Hellenised Scythian" tribe of the Callipidae, the Histrians, the Geloni to the north of Scythia, and the Hellenised populations in and around Crimea.

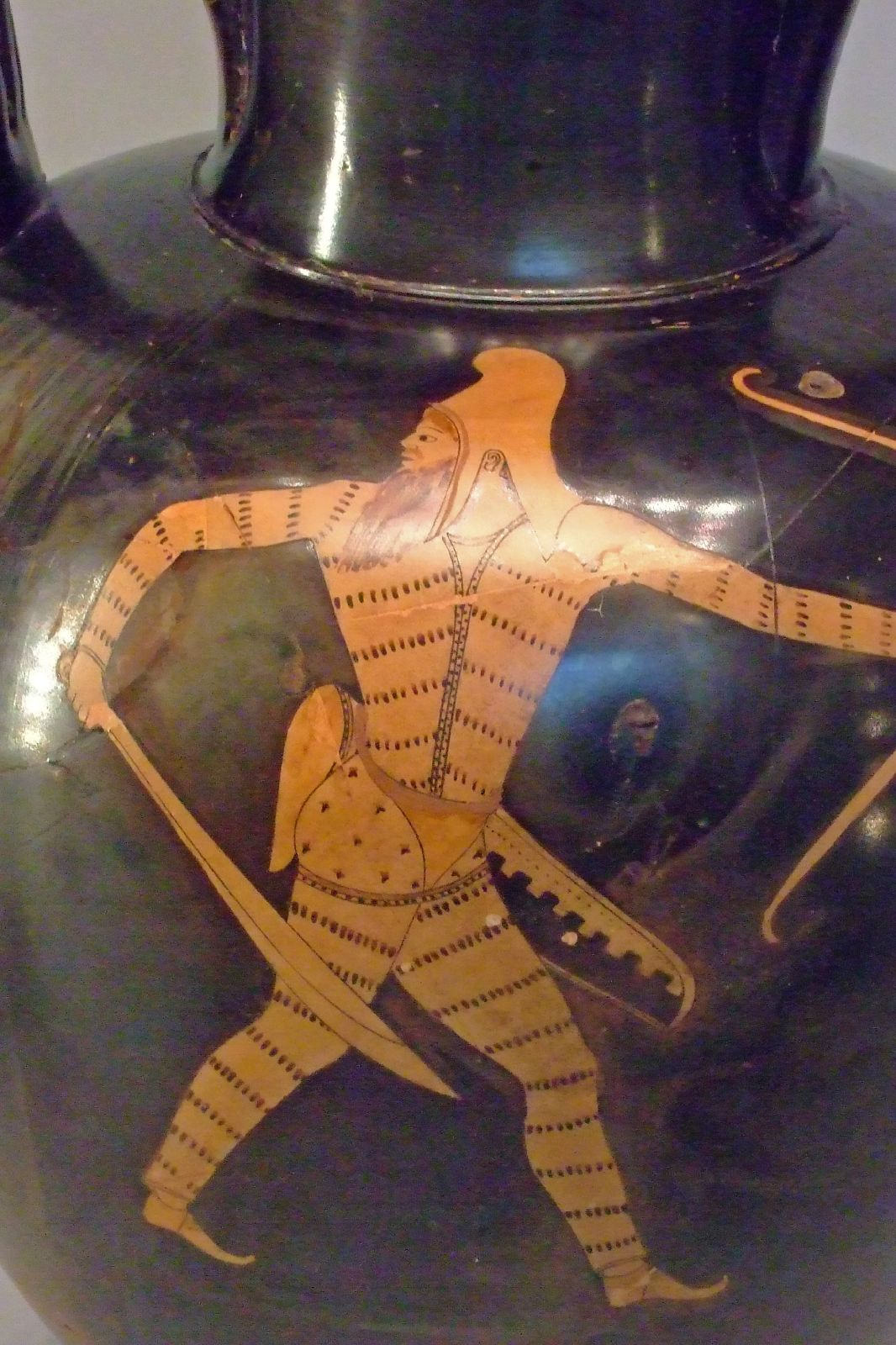
Red-figured amphora with a Scythian warrior, 480-470 BC, from Athens

In c. 547 BC, Cyrus II's Persian Achaemenid Empire had conquered the Lydian Empire and Anatolia, causing a large outflow of Greek refugees and a third wave of Greek colonisation of the Black Sea, from around c. 560 BC until c. 530 BC. The importance of the Greek colonies of the north Black Sea coast drastically increased after the Persian Achaemenid Empire's conquest of Egypt in 525 BC, which deprived the states of Greece proper of the Egyptian grain that they depended on.

The then-dominant Greek power of Athens therefore established well-defended colonies on the north Black Sea coast near already existing settlements, including Nymphaion near Pantikapaion, Athēnaion near Theodosia, and Stratokleia near Phanagoreia, where high-quality grain was produced. The various Greek city-states of the Aegean Sea also imported fish, furs and slaves from Scythia during this period, and from the mid-6th century BC the Greeks employed Scythian mercenaries in the form of mounted archers to support their own hoplite armies.

From the 6th to 4th centuries BC, the Scythian kingdom had good relations with the Sauromatians to the east. Scythian art was influenced by the Sauromatian culture. However, from c. 550 to c. 500 BC, Sauromatians from the Ural Mountains to the Caspian Steppe were pressed by the Massagetae of Central Asia due to campaigns against them by Cyrus II. In response, the Sauromatians took over Ciscaucasia from the Scythian kingdom. By the 5th century BC, the Scythians had completely retreated from Ciscaucasia.

This process caused Sauromatian nomads to immigrate near the Royal Scythians, and intermarry with local nomad inhabitants. This may have caused the replacement of the Scythian dynasty of Spargapeithes by that of Ariapeithes. This immigration introduced new social norms, including women warriors.

In the 6th century BC, the Scythian sage Anacharsis, brother of then-king Sauaios, traveled to Greece. He was respected as a philosopher, was granted Athenian citizenship and became popular in literature as a "man of Nature" and "noble savage" incarnating "Barbarian wisdom", and a favourite figure of the Cynics.

===== Persian invasion =====
Map of the Scythian campaign of Darius I.

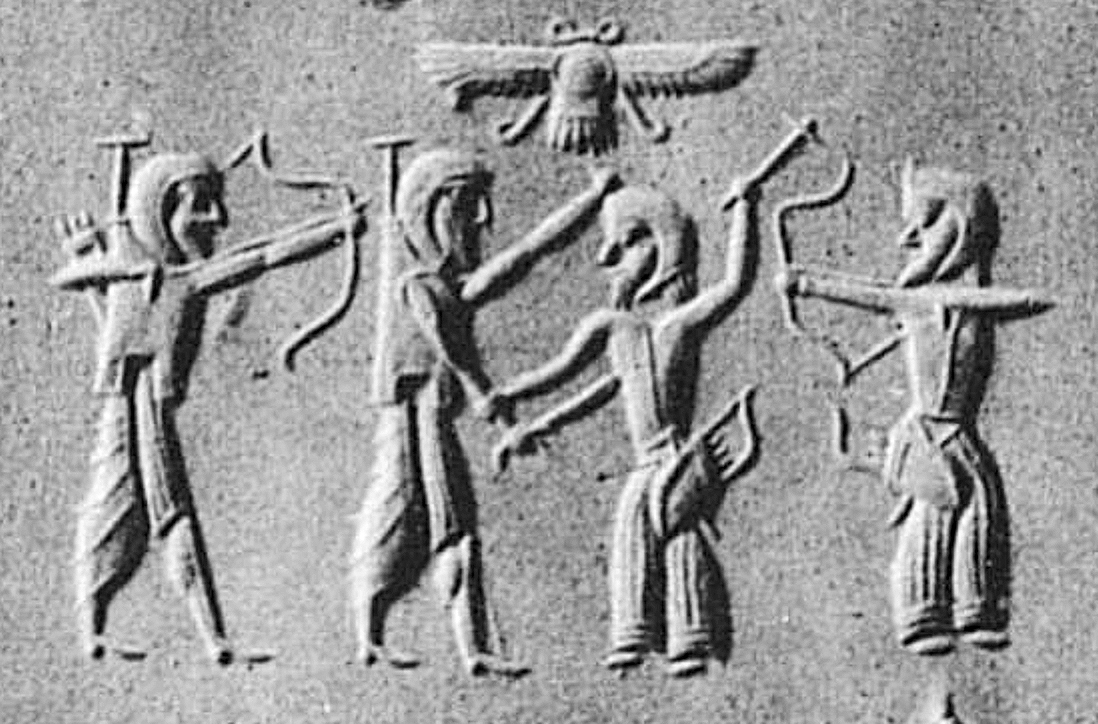
Persian soldiers (left) fighting against Scythians. Cylinder seal impression.

In the late 6th century BC, the Achaemenid Persian Empire started expanding into Europe, beginning with the Persian annexation of all of Thrace, after which the Achaemenid king of kings Darius I crossed the Istros river in 513 BC and attacked the Scythian kingdom with an army of 700,000 to 800,000 soldiers, possibly with the goal of annexing it.

The results of this campaign are unclear, with Darius I himself claiming that he had conquered the Sakā tayaiy paradraya (lit. 'the Saka who dwell beyond the (Black) Sea'), that is the Pontic Scythians, while the ancient Greek literary tradition, following the account of Herodotus of Halicarnassus, claimed that the Persian campaign had been defeated by the Scythians, due to which the Greeks started perceiving the Scythians as invincible thanks to their nomadic lifestyle.

Herodotus's narrative is considered dubious, and his account of the failure of Darius appears extremely exaggerated. Some form of Achaemenid authority might have been established in Pontic Scythia as a result of this campaign without it having been annexed.

=== Middle (or Classical) period ===
The retreat of the Scythians from Ciscaucasia and the arrival of Sauromatian incomers into the Pontic Steppe in the late 6th century BC gave rise to the Middle or Classical Scythian period, a hybrid culture originating from a combination of Ciscaucasian Scythian and Sauromatian elements. Among the changes in Scythia in this period was a significant increase in the number of monumental burials.

Due to the need to resist Persian encroachment, the Scythian kingdom underwent political consolidation in the early 5th century BC, during which it completed its evolution from a tribal confederation into an early state polity capable of dealing with the polities threatening or trading with it in an effective way; during this period, the Scythian kings increased their power and wealth by concentrating economic power under their authority. It was also during this period that the control of the Scythians over the western part of their kingdom became tighter. At some point between c. 475 and c. 460 BC, Ariapeithes was succeeded as king by his son Scyles.

==== Expansionism ====
A consequence of this consolidation of the Scythian kingdom was an increase in its expansionism and militarism. To the southeast, the Scythians came into conflict with their splinter tribe of the Sindi, whom they fought by crossing the frozen Cimmerian Bosporus during the winter. In the west, nearby Thrace became a target following the Achaemenid retreat from Europe, with the Scythians gaining free access to the Wallachian and Moldavian Steppes and to the south of the Istros river. In 496 BC, the Scythians launched a raid until as far south as the Hellespont. The Scythians' inroads in Thrace were however soon stopped by the emergence of the Odrysian kingdom in this region, following which the Scythian and Odrysian kingdoms mutually established the Istros as their common border around c. 480 BC: from then on, the Scythians and Thracians borrowed from the other's art and lifestyle; marriage between the Scythian and Odrysian aristocracies and royal families were also concluded.

A second direction where the Scythian kingdom expanded was in the north and north-west: the Scythian kingdom had continued its attempts to impose its rule on the forest steppe peoples and by the 5th century BC, it was finally able to complete the process after destroying their fortified settlements. Their cultures later fused with that of the Scythians. During the 5th century BC, Scythian rule over the forest steppe people became increasingly dominating and coercive, leading to a decline of their sedentary agrarian lifestyle. This in turn resulted in a reduction in the importation of Greek goods by the peoples of the forest steppe in the 5th century BC.

The peaceful relations which had until then prevailed between the Scythian kingdom and the Greek colonies of the northern Pontic region came to an end during the period of expansionism in the early 5th century BC, when the Scythian kings for the first time started trying to impose their rule over the Greek colonies. The Greek cities erected defensive installations while losing their agricultural production base. At the same time, because the Scythian kingdom still needed to trade with the Greeks in the lower Tanais region, in the early 5th century BC it replaced the destroyed Greek colony of Krēmnoi with a Scythian settlement. The hold of the Scythian kingdom on this region became firmer under Scyles, who was successfully able to impose Scythian rule on the Greek colonies such as Nikōnion, Tyras, Pontic Olbia, and Kerkinitis. Scyles' control over Nikōnion was at the time it was a member of the Delian League, putting it under the simultaneous hegemony of both the Scythian kingdom and Athens. This allowed the Scythian kingdom to engage in relations with Athens when it was at the height of its power. In consequence, a community of Scythians also lived in Athens at this time, as attested by Scythian graves in the Kerameikos cemetery.

The Scythian kingdom was however less successful at conquering other Greek colonies, around 30 of which, including Myrmēkion, Tyritakē, and Porthmeus, banded together into an alliance and successfully defended their independence. After this, they united into the Bosporan kingdom. The Bosporan kingdom soon became a centre of production for Scythian customers living in the steppes and contributed to the development of Scythian art and style. Despite the conflicts between the Scythian kingdom and the Greek cities, mutually beneficial exchanges between the Scythians, Maeotians and Greeks continued. There was consequently a considerable migration of Scythians into Pontic Olbia at this time. The Greek colonies of the Black Sea coast continued adhering to their Hellenic culture while their population was very mixed. During this period Greek influences also became more significant among the Scythians, especially among the aristocracy.

==== Commercial activities ====
As result of these expansionist ventures, the Scythian kingdom implemented an economic policy through a division of labour according to which: the settled populations of the forest steppe produced grain, which they were now obliged to offer to the Scythian aristocracy as tribute, and which was then shipped through the Borysthenēs and Hypanis rivers to Pontic Olbia, Tyras, and Nikōnion, where these Greek cities traded the grain at a profit for themselves. The outbreak of the Peloponnesian War in Greece proper in 431 BC further increased the importance of the Pontic Steppe in supplying grain to Greece. The Scythians also sold cattle and animal products to the Greeks.

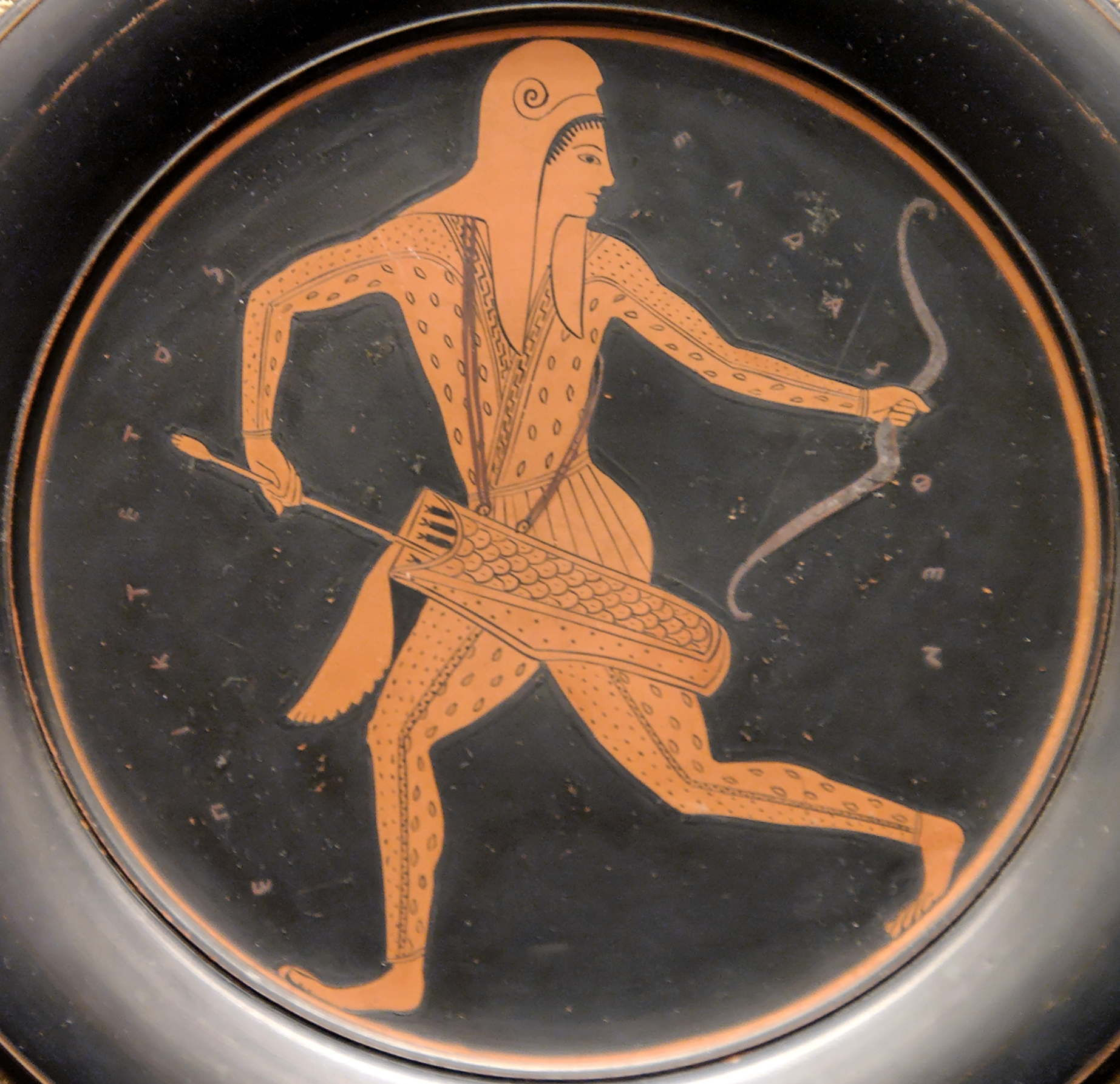
An Attic red-figure vase-painting of a Scythian archer. Epiktetos, 520–500 BC.

The Greek cities in the Aegean Sea had started to import slaves from Scythia immediately after the end of the Persian invasions of Greece. The Greek cities acted as slave trade hubs for the Black Sea slave trade (or Pontic slave trade) but did not themselves capture slaves, and instead depended on the Scythian rulers to acquire slaves for them: the Scythian aristocrats nonetheless still found it profitable to acquire slaves from their subordinate tribes or through military raids in the forest steppe. One group of slaves was bought by the city of Athens, where they constituted an organisation of public slaves employed by the city as an urban police force.

===== Greek influence =====
The Greek colonies were the main suppliers of luxury goods and art to the Scythians. Trade with the Greeks especially created a thriving demand for wine in Scythia: In exchange for slaves, the Greeks sold various consumer goods to the Scythians, the most prominent among these being wine. The island of Chios in the Aegean Sea, especially, produced wine to be sold to the Scythians, in exchange of which slaves from Scythia were sold in the island's very prominent slave market. Other commodities sold by the Greeks to the Scythians included fabrics, vessels, decorations made of precious metals, bronze items, and black burnished pottery.

Under these conditions, the grain and slave trade continued, and Pontic Olbia experienced economic prosperity. The Scythian aristocracy also derived immense revenue from these commercial activities with the Greeks, most especially from the grain trade, with Scythian coins struck in Greek cities bearing the images of ears of grain. This prosperity of the Scythian aristocracy is attested by how the lavish aristocratic burials progressively included more relatives, retainers, and were richly furnished with grave goods, especially imported ones, consisting of gold jewellery, silver and gold objects, including fine Greek-made toreutics, vessels and jewellery, and gold-plated weapons. Scythian commoners however did not obtain any benefits from this trade, with luxury goods being absent from their tombs.

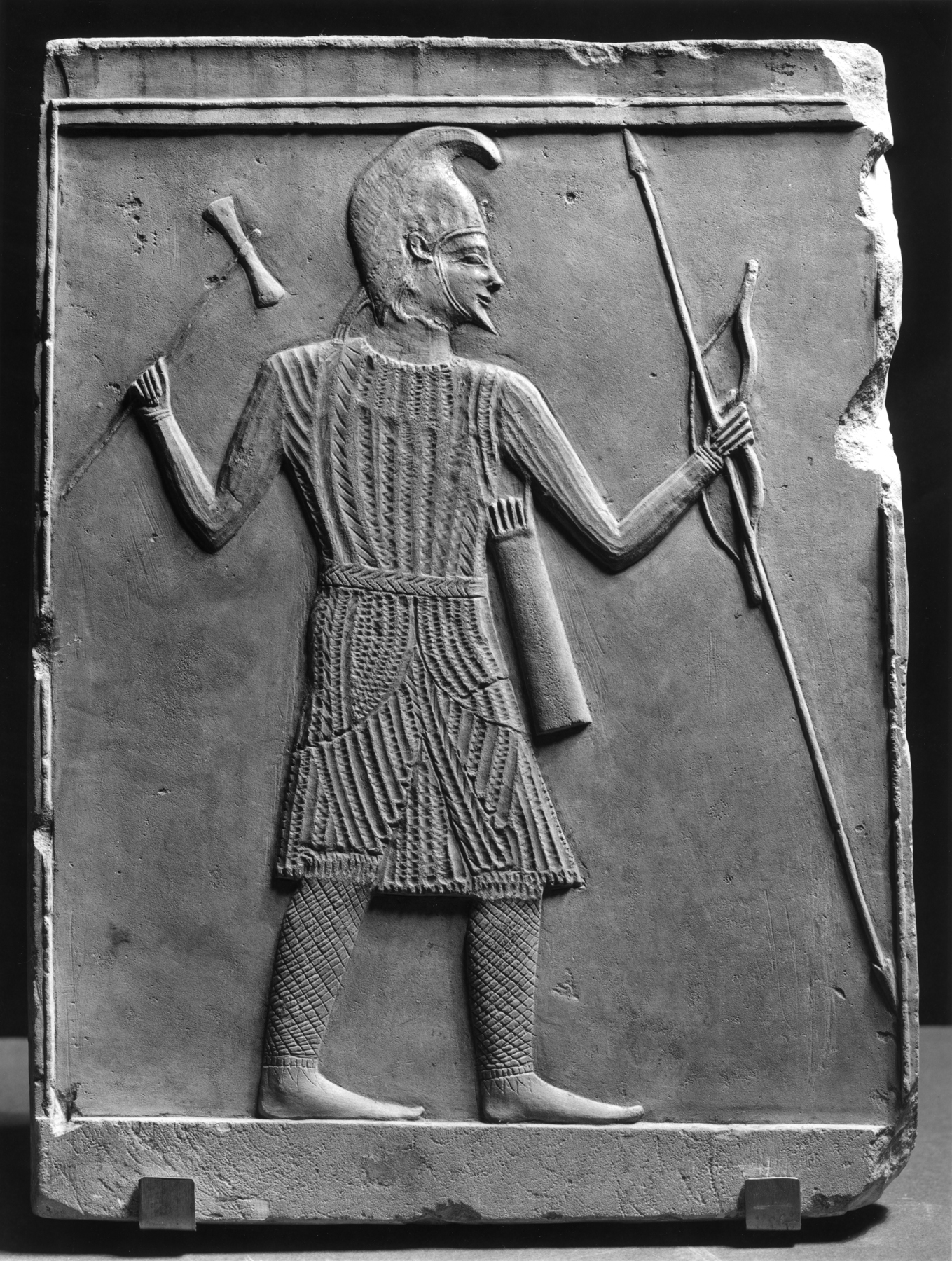
Scythian warrior with axe, bow, and spear. Possibly Greek work 4th-2nd century BCE (archaic). Marble with red paint and gold leaf

A consequence of the Scythians' close contacts with Greeks was a progressive Hellenisation of the Scythian aristocracy. The Greek supply of luxury goods also influenced Scythian art. Greek influence also shaped the evolution of Scythian weapons and horse harnesses: the Scythian composite armour, for example, was fitted with Greek-type shoulder guards in the 5th century BC.

==== Early sedentarisation ====
Around this time the steppe climate also became warmer and wetter, which allowed the nomads to rear their large herds of animals in abundance; combined with Greek influence, this acted as a catalyst for the process of sedentarisation of many nomadic Scythians which started during the Middle Scythian period in the late 5th century BC. especially in areas where the terrain was propitious for agriculture. Archaeological evidence suggests that the population of the agriculture-focused Tauric Chersonese increased by 600%, especially in the Trachean Chersonese.

This process led to the foundation in the late 5th and early 4th centuries BC of several new city-sites including important sites located on major routes which provided access to the major rivers of Scythia. For example, the city of Kamianka had become the economic, political and commercial capital of the Scythian kingdom in the late 5th century BC. Until the 3rd century BC, the majority of Scythians nevertheless still remained composed of nomads.

==== Instabilities ====
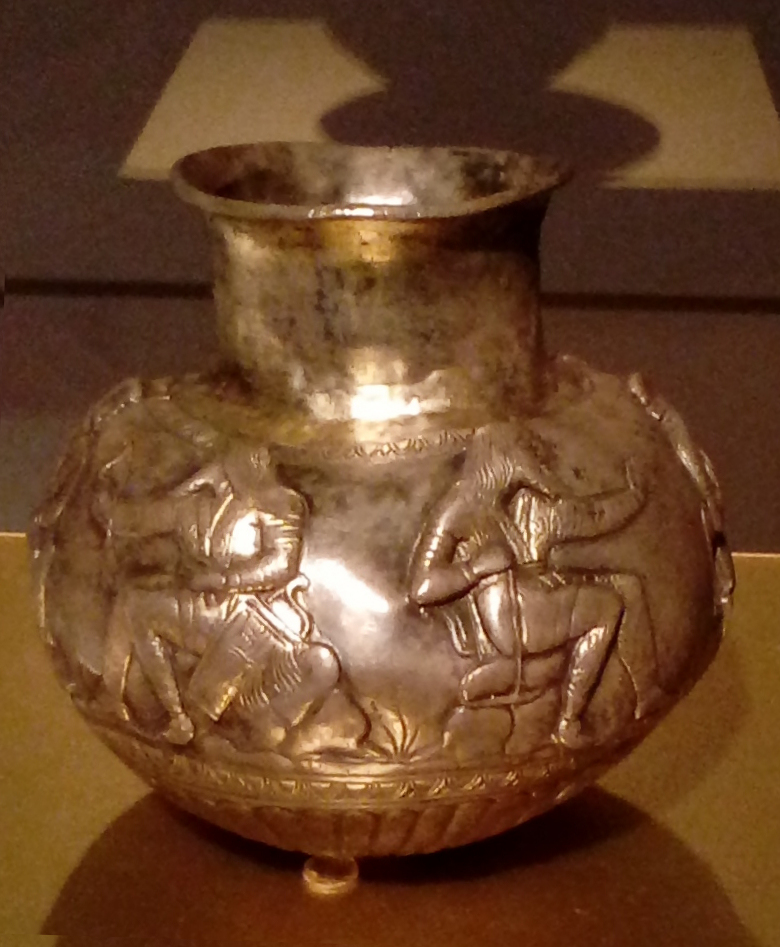
Scythian vessel from Voronež, 4th century BC. Hermitage Museum.

Some time around c. 440 BC, Scyles was overthrown and executed by his half-brother Octamasadas. As a result of the Scythian kingdom's prosperity during this period, neighbouring populations borrowed elements of Scythian culture: for example, Scythian-type arrowheads were found in Central and Western Europe. The Thracian Getae of the Carpathian and Balkan regions imported large amounts of Scythian-manufactured weapons and horse equipment. Thanks to the close family connections of Octamasadas to the Thracian Odrysian dynasty, contacts between the Scythian kingdom and Odrysian-ruled Thrace intensified during the period from c. 440 to c. 400 BC. Significant Thracian influence consequently appeared in Scythian grave goods.

A Thracian aristocrat named Spartocus seized leadership of the Bosporan kingdom in c. 438 BC. He was possibly connected to the accession of the pro-Odrysian Octamasadas. These changes in the Bosporan Kingdom also led to cultural changes within it in the late 5th century BC, so that the Greek customs which had until then been normative there gave way to more Scythian ones. Under the Spartocid dynasty, the Bosporan kingdom thrived and maintained stable relations with the Scythian kingdom which allowed it to expand its rule conquer several non-Greek territories on the Asian side of the Cimmerian Bosporus. This process transformed the Bosporan kingdom into a cosmopolitan realm.

It was then that Pontic Olbia started declining, partly due to the instability within the Scythian steppe to its north, but also because most of the trade, including the grain exports of the Scythian kingdom, passing through Oblia until then shifted to transiting through the cities of the Cimmerian Bosporus constiting the Bosporan Kingdom at this time. The Scythians instead started importing luxury goods made in Bosporan Greek workshops, whose products thus replaced Olbian ones. Around that same time, Athenian commercial influence in the Bosporan Kingdom started declining, and it had fully come to an end by 404 BC.

Pressured by groups of the Massagetae, sometime between c. 430 and c. 400 BC, a second wave of migration of Sauromatians entered Scythia, where these newcomers intermarried with the Scythian tribes already present there after which they may possibly have established themselves as the new ruling aristocracy of the Scythian kingdom. The sedentary communities of the forest steppe also came under pressure from this new wave of nomadic incomers. This, as well as internal conflicts among the Scythians, caused a temporary destabilisation of the Scythian kingdom which caused it to lose control of the Greek cities on the north shores of the Black Sea. The Greek colonies of Pontic Olbia, Nikōnion, and Tyras started to not only rebuild their khōrai, but even expanded them during the late 5th and early 4th centuries BC. Meanwhile, Nymphaion was annexed by the Bosporan kingdom.

==== Golden Age ====
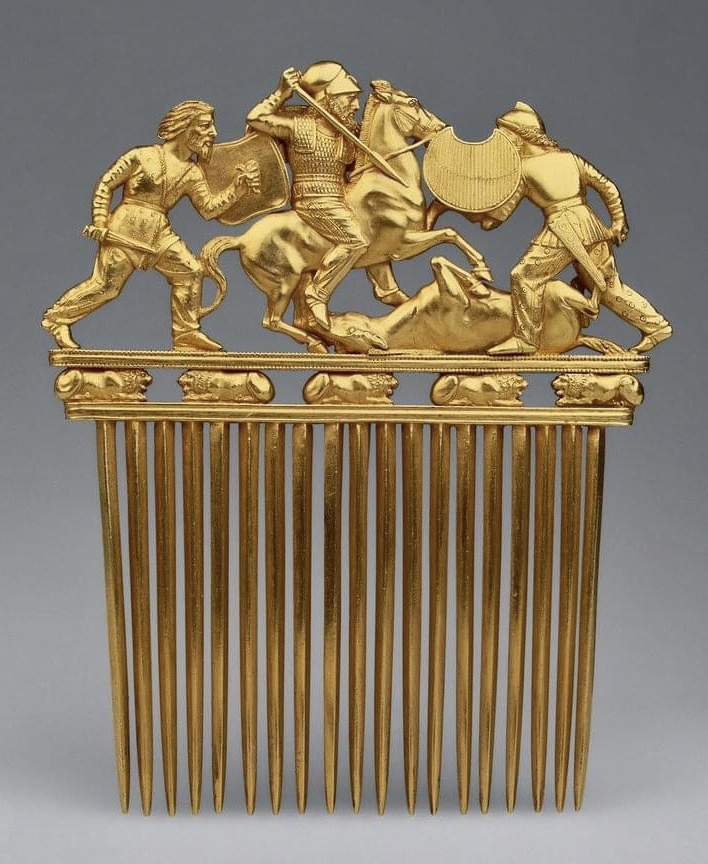
Scythian gold comb from Solokha, early 4th century BC

The period of instability ended soon, and Scythian culture experienced a period of prosperity during the 4th century BC. Most Scythian monuments and the richest Scythian royal burials dating from this period, as exemplified by the lavish Čortomlyk mohyla. This height of Scythian power corresponded to a time of unprecedented prosperity for the Greek colonies of the northern Black Sea: there was high demand for the Greek cities' trade goods. Consequently, Scythian culture, especially that of the aristocracy, experienced rapidly-occurring extensive Hellenisation.

The rule of the Spartocid dynasty in the Bosporan Kingdom under the kings Leukon I, Spartocus II and Pairisadēs I was also favourable for the Scythian kingdom because they provided stability. Leukon employed Scythians in his army, and he was able to capture Theodosia with the help of Scythian horse cavalry, which he claimed to trust more than his own army. Extensive contacts existed between the Scythian and Bosporan nobilities, possibly including dynastic marriages between the Scythian and Bosporan royalty; the rich burial of Kul-Oba belonged to one such Scythian noble who chose to be buried in a Greek-style tomb.

During this time, and with the support of the Scythian kings, the sedentarised Scythian farmers sold up to 16,000 tonnes to Pantikapaion, who in turn sold this grain to Athens in mainland Greece. The dealings between mainland Greece and the northern Pontic region were significant enough that the Athenian Dēmosthenēs had significant commercial endeavours in the Bosporan kingdom, from where he received a 1000 medimnoi of wheat per year, and he had the statues of the Bosporan rulers Pairisadēs I, Satyros I and Gorgippos insalled in the Athenian market. Dēmosthenēs himself had had a Scythian maternal grandmother, and his political opponents Dinarchus and Aeschines went so far as to launch racist attacks against Dēmosthenēs by referring to his Scythian ancestry to attempt discrediting him.

The Scythian kingdom experienced an early wave of immigration by a related Iranic nomadic people, the Sarmatians, during the 4th century BC, to the Pontic steppe. This slow flow of Sarmatian immigration continued during the late 4th and early 3rd centuries BC, but these small and isolated groups did not negatively affect its hegemony.

===== The reign of Ateas =====
Coin of the Scythian king Ateas

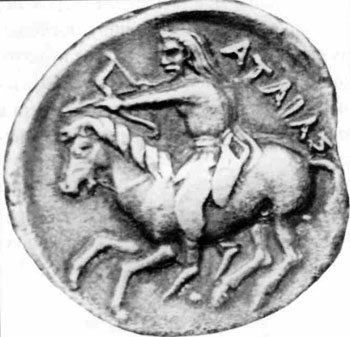
Reverse: depicting a mounted warrior and a coin legend reading ΑΤΑΙΑΣ

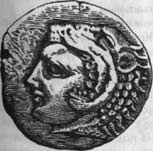
Obverse: depicting the head of Herakles

Between c. 360s and 339 BC, the Scythians were ruled by their most famous king, Ateas, whose reign coincided with the growth of the kingdom of Macedonia under its king Philip II. The main activities of Ateas were directed towards expanding c. 350 BC Scythian hegemony to the lands south of the Istros. Ateas also successfully battled the Thracian Triballi and the Dacian Histriani, as well as threatened to conquer the city of Byzantion, where he may also have struck his coins.

Since both Ateas and Philip had been interested in the region to the immediate south of the Istros, the two kings formed an alliance against the Histriani. However, this alliance soon fell apart and war broke out between the Scythian and Macedonian kingdoms, ending in 339 BC in a battle at the estuary of the Istros where Ateas was killed. The Scythian kingdom had lost its new territories in Thrace due to this defeat. The power of Scythian kingdom was not immediately harmed by the death of Ateas, and it did not experience any weakening or disintegration as a result of it: the Kamianka city continued to prosper and the Scythian burials from this time continued to be lavishly furnished.

==== Decline and fall of Pontic Scythia ====
The defeat against Philip II was followed by a series of military defeats which led to a significant decline during the late 4th century BC. Although the experience of Philip II's military dealings with the Scythians led his son Alexander the Great to choose to avoid attacking them, his conquests harmed trade networks Pontic Olbia depended on. In 331 or 330 BC, Alexander III's general Zopyrion campaigned against the Scythian kingdom. Although Zōpyriōn's army was defeated by the Scythians, his attack initiated the final decline of Olbia, and various tribes from the West such as the Celts started moving into its territories.

In 309 BC, the Scythian king Agaros participated in the Bosporan Civil War on the side of Satyros II against his half-brother Eumēlos. Agaros provided Satyros with 20,000 infantrymen and 10,000 cavalrymen, and after Satyros was defeated and killed, his son fled to Agaros's realm for refuge. In the early 3rd century BC, the Scythian kingdom started declining economically as a result of competition from Egypt, which under the Ptolemaic dynasty had again become a supplier of grain to Greece.

In the early 3rd century BC, the Scythian kingdom faced a number of interlocking unfavourable conditions, such as climatic changes in the steppes and economic crises from overgrazed pastures and a series of military setbacks, as well as the intensifiation of the arrival from the east of the Sarmatians, who captured Scythian pastures. With the loss of its most important resource, the Scythian kingdom suddenly collapsed, and the Scythian capital of Kamianka was abandoned. The Sarmatian tribe responsible for most of the destruction were the Roxolani.

As a consequence, the material culture of the Scythians also disappeared in the early 3rd century BC. The peoples of the forest steppe also became independent again, returning to their sedentary lifestyle while all Scythian elements disappeared from their culture. Grain exports from the northern Pontic region declined drastically, while Greek inscriptions stopped mentioning names of Scythian slaves. Following the invasion, the Sarmatian tribes became the new dominant force of the Pontic Steppe, resulting in the name "Sarmatia Europa" (lit. 'European Sarmatia') replacing "Scythia" as the name of the Pontic Steppe.

Sarmatian pressure against the Scythians continued in the 3rd century BC, so that the Sarmatians had reached as far as the city of Chersonesus in the Tauric Chersonese by 280 BC, and most native and Greek settlements on the north shore of the Black Sea were destroyed by the Sarmatians over the course of the c. 270s to c. 260s BC, Celts, the Thracian Getae, and the Germanic Bastarnae from the west, also put the Scythians under pressure by seizing their lands. By the early 2nd century BC, the Bastarnae had grown powerful enough that they were able to stop the southward advance of the Sarmatians along the line of the Istros river.

=== Late period ===
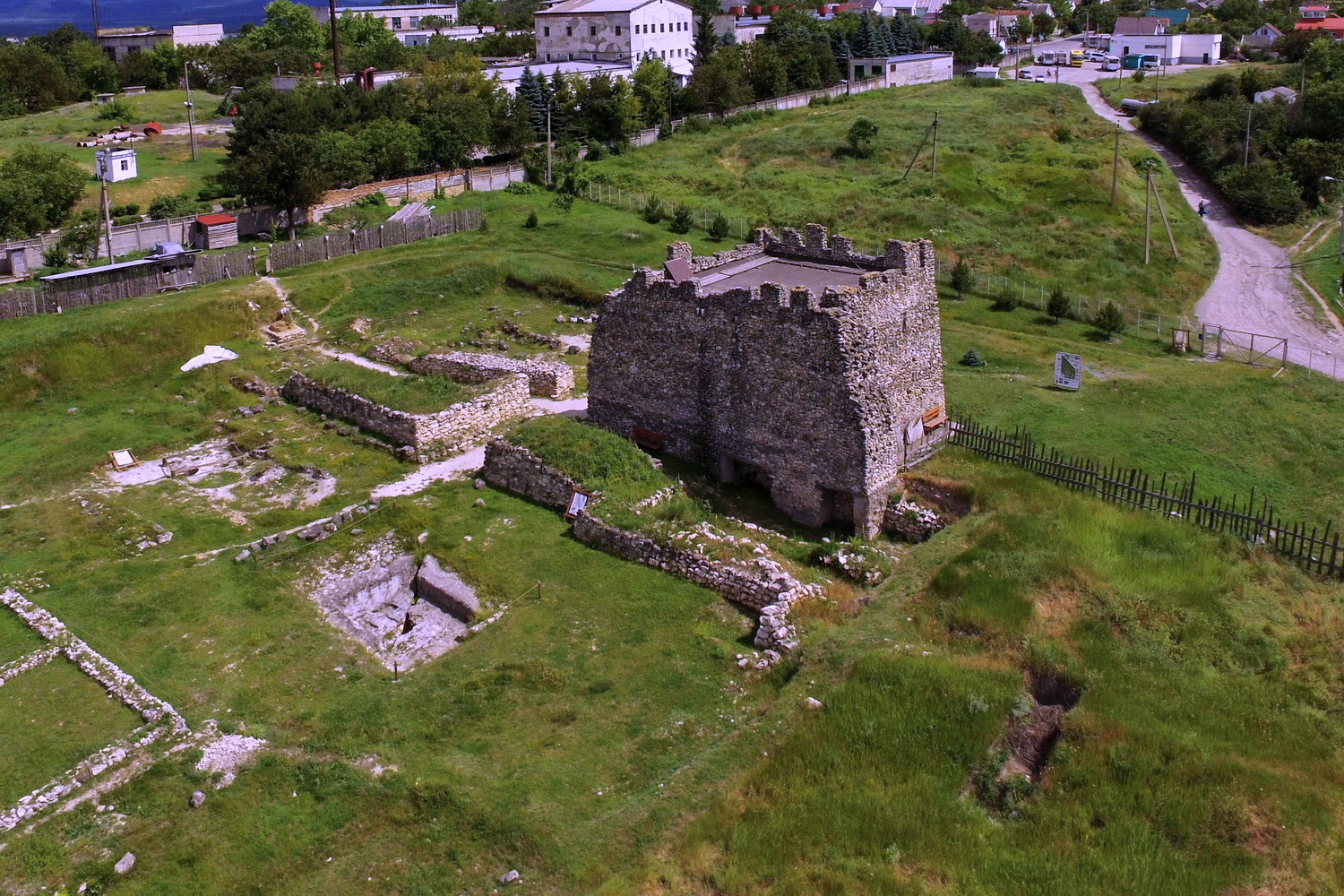
Remains of Scythian Neapolis near modern-day Simferopol, Crimea. It served as the capital of the Little Scythia in the Tauric Chersonese.

With the Sarmatian invasion and the collapse of the Pontic Scythian kingdom, the Scythians were pushed to the fringes of the northern Pontic region where urban life was still possible, and they retreated to a series of fortified settlements along the major rivers and fled to the two regions both known as "Little Scythia," which remained the only places where the Scythians could still be found in by the 2nd century BC were:

- the first Little Scythia, whose capital was Scythian Neapolis, was composed of the territories of the Tauric Chersonese and the lower reaches of the Borysthenēs and Hypanis rivers;
- the second Little Scythia was located in the northeast of Thrace immediately to the south of the mouth of the Istros river and the west of the Black Sea, in the territory corresponding to present-day Dobruja.

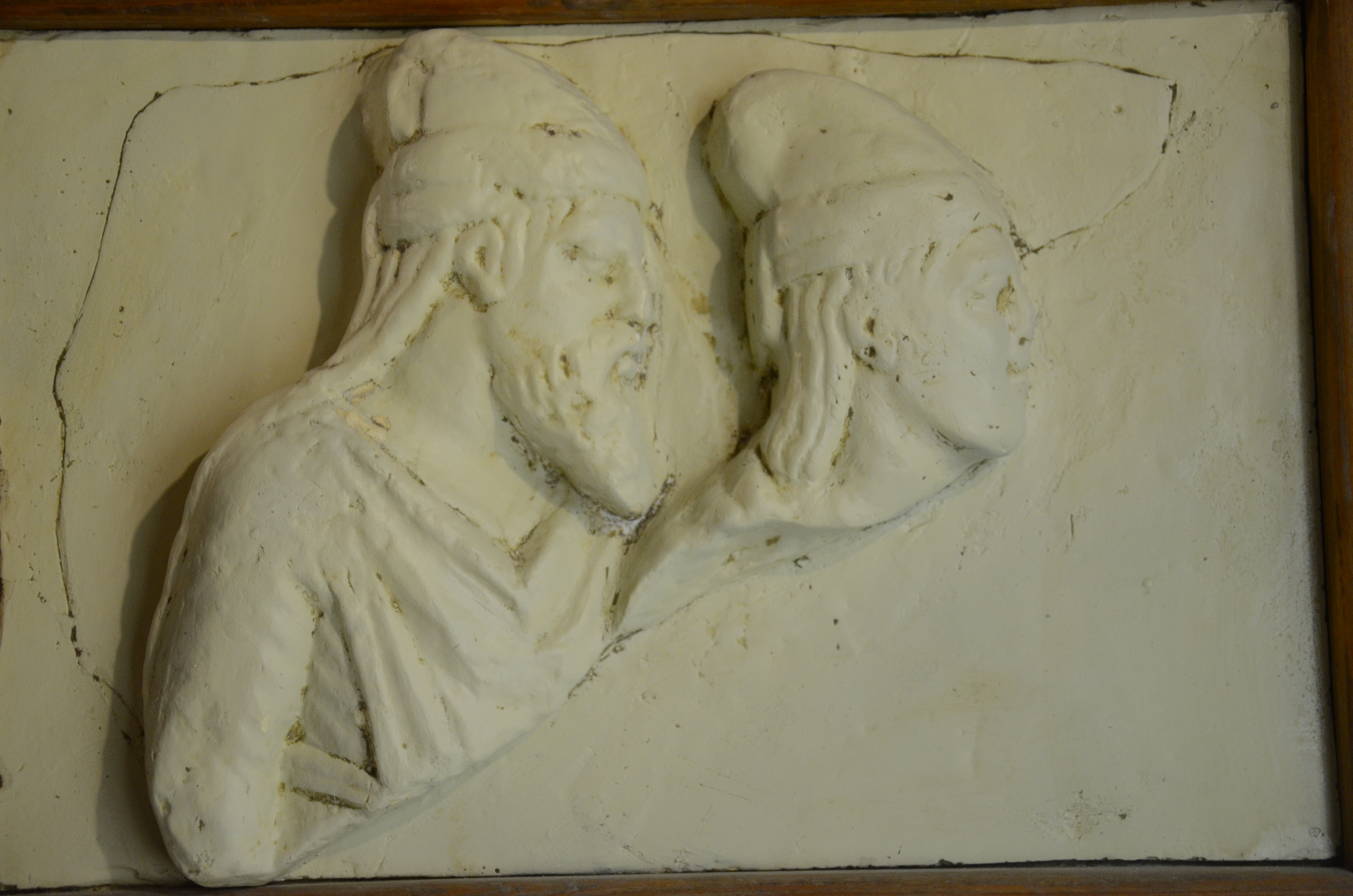
Relief of the most well-known kings of the Tauric Little Scythia, Skilurus and his son Palacus.

By this time, although the Scythians living in the Tauric Chersonese had managed to retain some of their nomadic lifestyle, the limited area of their polity forced them to become more and more sedentary and to primarily engage in stockbreeding in far away pastures, as well as in agriculture, and they also acted as trading intermediaries between the Graeco-Roman world and the peoples of the steppes.

With sedentarisation, both fortified and unfortified settlements replaced the older nomadic camps in the basin of the lower Borysthenēs river, which prevented the remaining Scythians from continuing to maintain a steppe economy. Therefore, the number of fortified settlements in the Tauric Chersonese increased with the retreat into this territory and away from the steppe of the Scythian aristocracy, who was then rapidly embracing a Hellenistic lifestyle. By the 1st century BC, these Scythians living in the Tauric Chersonese had fully become sedentary farmers.

These later Scythians slowly intermarried with the native Tauri and the infiltrating Sarmatians, and their culture had little to do with the earlier classical Scythian culture, instead consisting of a combination of those with the traditions of the Tauroi from the mountains of the Tauric Chersonese and of the Greeks of the coasts, and exhibiting Sarmatian and La Tène Celtic influences.

In the 1st century BC, both Little Scythias were destroyed and their territories annexed by the king Mithridates VI Eupator of the kingdom of Pontus despite the Scythians' alliance with their former enemies, the Roxolani, against him.

==== End ====
The Scythian populations in both Little Scythias continued to exist after the end of Mithridates's empire, although they had become fully sedentary by then and were increasingly intermarrying with the native Tauri, hence why Roman sources often referred to them as "Tauro-Scythians" (Ancient Greek: Ταυροσκύθαι, romanized: Tauroskúthai; Latin: Tauroscythae).

These late Scythians were slowly assimilated by the Sarmatians over the course of c. 50 to c. 150 AD, although they continued to exist as an independent people throughout the 2nd century AD until around c. 250 AD: in the settled regions of the lower Borysthenēs, lower Hypanis, and the Tauric Chersonese, an urbanised and Hellenised Scythian society continued to develop which also exhibited Thracian and Celtic influences.

The Scytho-Sarmatian Iranic nomads' dominance of the Pontic Steppe finally ended with the invasion of the Goths and other Germanic tribes around c. 200 AD, which was when the Scythian settlements in Crimea and the lower Borysthenēs were permanently destroyed.

The Scythians nevertheless continued to exist until the invasion of the Huns in the 4th century AD, and they finally ceased to exist as an independent group after being fully assimilated by the other populations who moved into the Pontic Steppe at the height of the Migration Period in the 5th century AD.

== Legacy ==
The Graeco-Roman peoples were profoundly fascinated by the Scythians. This fascination endured in Europe even after both the disappearance of the Scythians and the end of Graeco-Roman culture, and continued throughout Classical and Late Antiquity and the Middle Ages, lasting till the 18th century in the Modern Period.

=== Antiquity ===
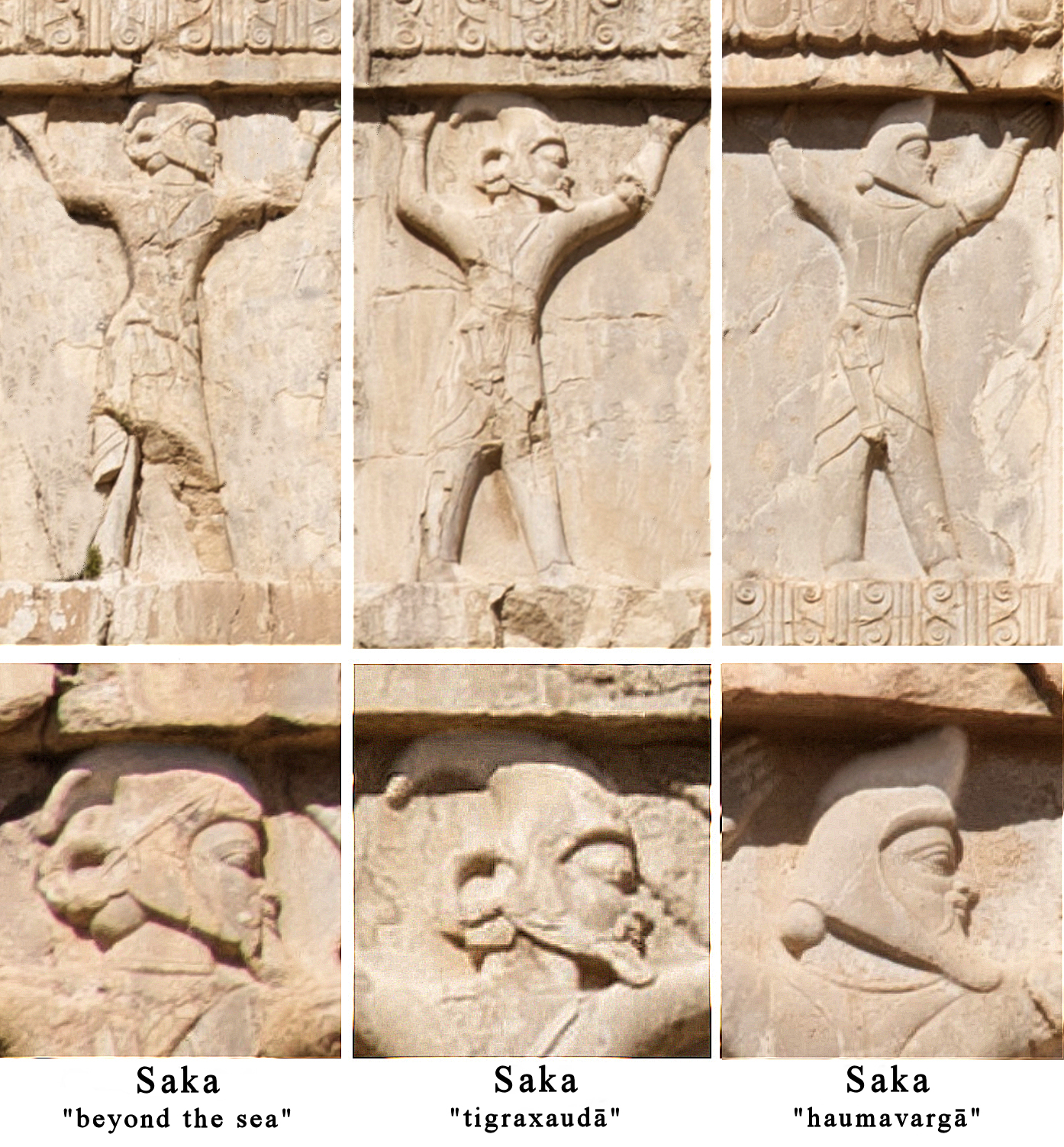
For the Achaemenids, there were three types of Sakas: * the Sakā tayai paradraya ("beyond the sea", presumably the Scythians between the Greeks and the Thracians on the Western side of the Black Sea), * the Sakā tigraxaudā (Massagetae, "with pointed caps"), * the Sakā haumavargā ("who lay down Hauma", furthest East). Soldiers in the service of the Achaemenid army, Xerxes I tomb detail, circa 480 BC.

The inroads of the Cimmerians and the Scythians into West Asia over the course of the 8th to 7th centuries BC, which were early precursors of the later invasions of West Asia by steppe nomads such as the Huns, various Turkic peoples, and the Mongols, in Late Antiquity and the Mediaeval Period, had destabilised the political balance which had prevailed in the region between the dominant great powers of Assyria, Urartu, and Phrygia, thus irreversibly changing the geopolitical situation of West Asia. These Cimmerians and Scythians also influenced the developments in West Asia through the spread of the steppe nomad military technology brought by them into this region.

The first mention of the Scythians in ancient Greek literature is in Hesiod's Catalogue of Women, which refers to them as the "mare-milking Scythians" (Ancient Greek: Σκύθας ἱππημολγούς, romanized: Skúthas hippēmolgoús) and as the "milk-drinkers who have wagons for houses" (Ancient Greek: γλακτοφάγων ἐς γαῖαν ἀπήνας οἰκί᾽ ἐχόντων, romanized: glaktophágōn es gaîan apḗnas oikí' ekhóntōn) Hesiod also referred to the Scythians along with the Ethiopians and Libyans as peoples "whose mind is over their tongue," that is who approve of prudent reserve.

Herodotus of Halicarnassus wrote a legendary account of the arrival of the Scythians. Herodotus's narrative also contracted the events of the Scythians' arrival into West Asia by portraying Madyes as the king led them from the steppes into West Asia. Herodotus also exaggerated the power of the Scythians in West Asia by claiming that they dominated all of it. Herodotus's narrative depicted Scythia as an opposite of Africa, especially Egypt, which was a theme continued by other ancient Greek authors, such as Pseudo-Hippocrates, who represented Greece as being the mean situated between these two extremes.

By the 5th century BC, the image of the Scythians in Athens had become the quintessential stereotype used for barbarians, (non-Greeks). They increasingly associated the Scythians with drunkenness. Ancient Greek authors considered the Scythians and Persians, not as related Iranic peoples, but in opposition to each other. The Scythians represented "savagery" and were linked to the Thracians, while the Persians represented "refined civilisation" and were connected to the Assyrians and Babylonians.

The 4th century BC Greek historian, Ephorus of Cyme, described the Scythians as one of the "four great barbarian peoples" of the known world, along with the Celts, Persians, and Libyans. Ephorus used the perception of Anacharsis as a personification of "Barbarian wisdom" to create an idealised image of the Scythians being as an "invincible" people, which became a tradition of Greek literature. Ephorus created a fictitious account of a legendary Scythian king, named Idanthyrsos or Iandysos, who became the ruler of all Asia.

The Ancient Greeks included the Scythians in their mythology, with Herodorus making a mythical Scythian named Teutarus into a herdsman who served Amphitryon and taught archery to Heracles. Herodorus also portrayed the Titan Prometheus as a Scythian king, and, by extension, described Prometheus's son Deucalion as a Scythian as well. The Romans confused the peoples whom they perceived as archetypical "Barbarians," namely the Scythians and the Celts, into a single grouping whom they called the "Celto-Scythians" (Latin: Celtoscythae) and supposedly living from Gaul in the west to the Pontic steppe in the east.

Strabo of Amasia idealised the Scythians as leading a nomadic life founded on simplicity. According to Strabo's narrative, the Scythians became "corrupted" and lost their simple and honest life because of the influence of the Greeks' "love of luxury and sensual pleasures." Following Strabo, the Scythians continued to be represented as an idealised freedom-loving and truthful people. Later Graeco-Roman tradition transformed the Scythian prince Anacharsis into a legendary figure as a kind of "noble savage" who represented "Barbarian wisdom," due to which the ancient Greeks included him as one of the Seven Sages of Greece and he became a popular figure in Greek literature.

The richness of Scythian burials was already well known in Antiquity, and, by the 3rd century BC, the robbing of Scythian graves had begun, initially carried out by Scythians themselves. During Late Antiquity itself, another wave of grave robbery of Scythian burials occurred at the time of the Sarmatian and Hunnish domination of the Pontic Steppe, when these peoples reused older Scythian kurgans to bury their own dead.

=== Mediaeval period ===
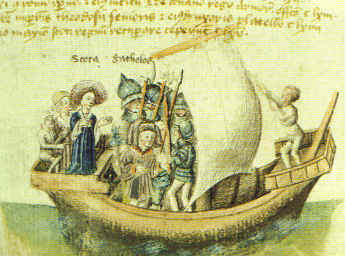
The flight of the Scota, Goídel Glas, and the Scythians from Egypt, in a 15th-century manuscript of the Scotichronicon of Walter Bower

Although the Scythians themselves had disappeared by the Middle Ages, the complex relations between their nomadic groupings and the settled populations of Southeast and Central Europe were continued by the Hungarians, the Bulgars, Rus' and Poles. Mediaeval authors followed the use of the name of the Scythians as an archaising term for steppe nomads to designate the Mongols.

Various cultures of North Europe started claiming ancestry from the "Scythians" and adopted the Graeco-Roman vision of the "barbarity" of ancient peoples of Europe as legitimate records of their own ancient cultures. In this context, the similarity of the name Scythia with the Latin name of the Irish, Scotti, led to the flourishing of speculations of a Scythian ancestry of the Irish. Drawing on the confusion of the Scotti with both Scythia and the Picti, as well as on the conceptualisation of Scythia as a typical "barbarian land", Bede invented a Scythian origin for the Picts in his Historia ecclesiastica gentis Anglorum.

The Irish mythological text titled the Lebor Gabála Érenn repeated this legend, and claimed that these supposed Scythian ancestors of the Irish had been invited to Egypt because the pharaoh admired how Nel, the son of Fénius, was knowledgeable on the world's many languages, with Nel marrying the pharaoh's daughter Scota. According to the Lebor Gabála Érenn, the Scythians fled from Egypt when the pharaoh drowned after Moses parted the Red Sea during the flight of the Israelites, and went back to Scythia, and from there to Ireland via Africa and Spain while Nel's and Scota's son, Goídel Glas, became the eponym for the Gaelic people.

=== Modern period ===
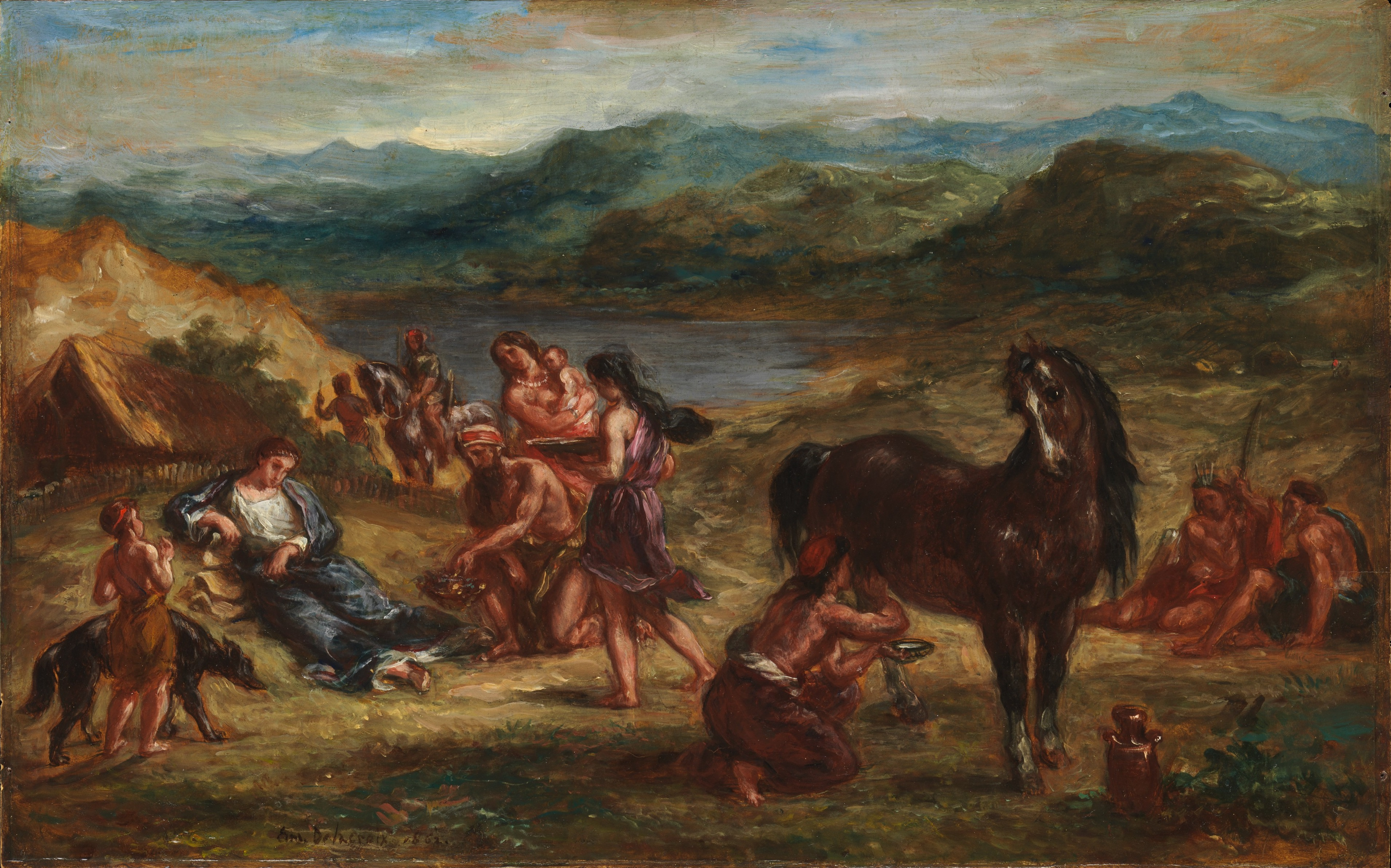
Eugène Delacroix's painting of the Roman poet, Ovid, in exile among the Scythians

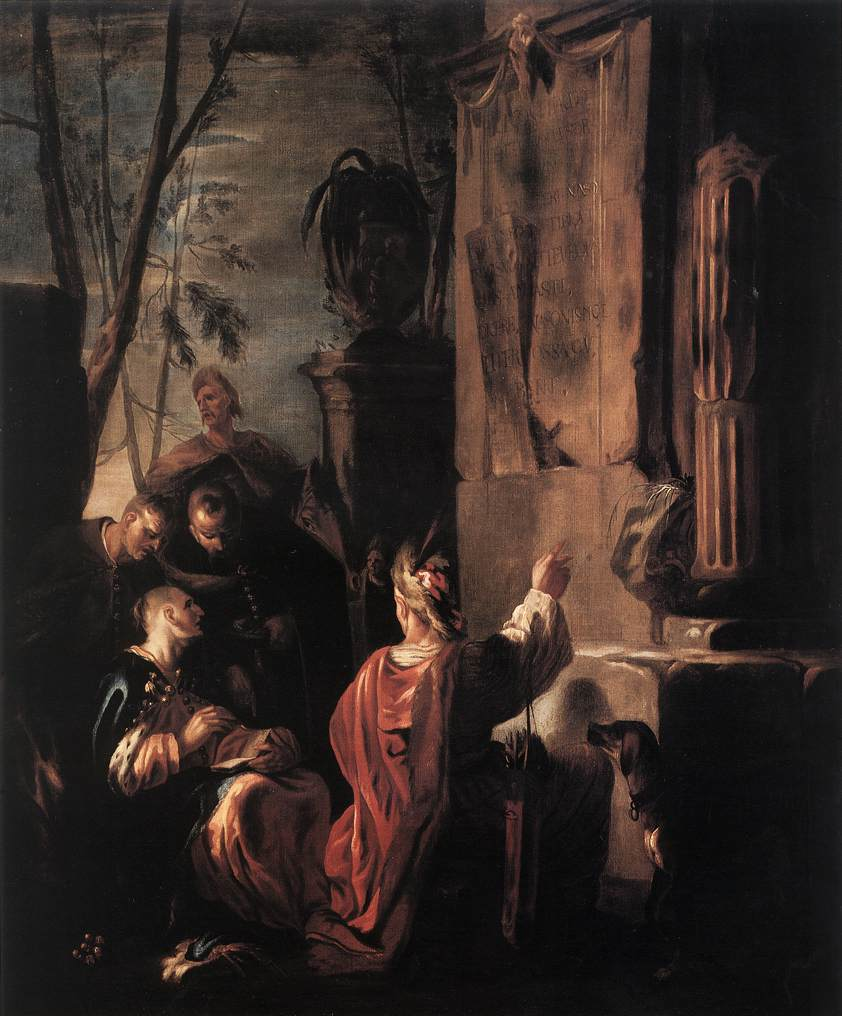
Scythians at the Tomb of Ovid (c. 1640), by Johann Heinrich Schönfeld

Drawing on the Biblical narrative and the Graeco-Roman conflation of the Scythians and Celts, early modern European scholars believed that the Celts were Scythians. It therefore became popular among pseudohistorians of the 15th and 16th centuries to claim that the Irish people were the "truest" inheritors of Scythian culture so as both to distinguish and denigrate Irish culture.

While these claims in much of Europe were abandoned during the Reformation and Renaissance, British works on Ireland continued to emphasise the alleged Scythian ancestry of the Irish, until it was discredited by early 19th century advances in philology.

During the early modern period itself, Hungarian scholars identified the Hungarians with the Huns, and claimed that they descended from Scythians. Therefore, the image of the Scythians among Hungarians was shaped into one of "noble savages" who were valorous and honest, uncouth and hostile to "Western refinement," but at the same time defended "Christian civilisation" from aggression from the East.

Large scale robbery of Scythian tombs started when the Russian Empire started occupying the Pontic steppe in the 18th century: in 1718 the Russian Tsar Peter I issued decrees overseeing the collection of "right old and rare" objects to Saint Petersburg in exchange for compensation, and the material thus obtained became the basis of the Saint Petersburg State Hermitage Museum's collection of Scythian gold. This resulted in significant grave robbery of Scythian burials, due to which most of the Scythian tombs of the Russian Empire had been sacked by 1764. In the 19th century, Scythian kurgans in Ukraine, Kuban, and Crimea had been looted, so that by the 20th century, more than 85% of Scythian kurgans excavated by archaeologists had already been pillaged. The grave robbers of the 18th and 19th centuries were experienced enough that they almost always found the burial chambers of the tombs and stole the treasures contained within them.

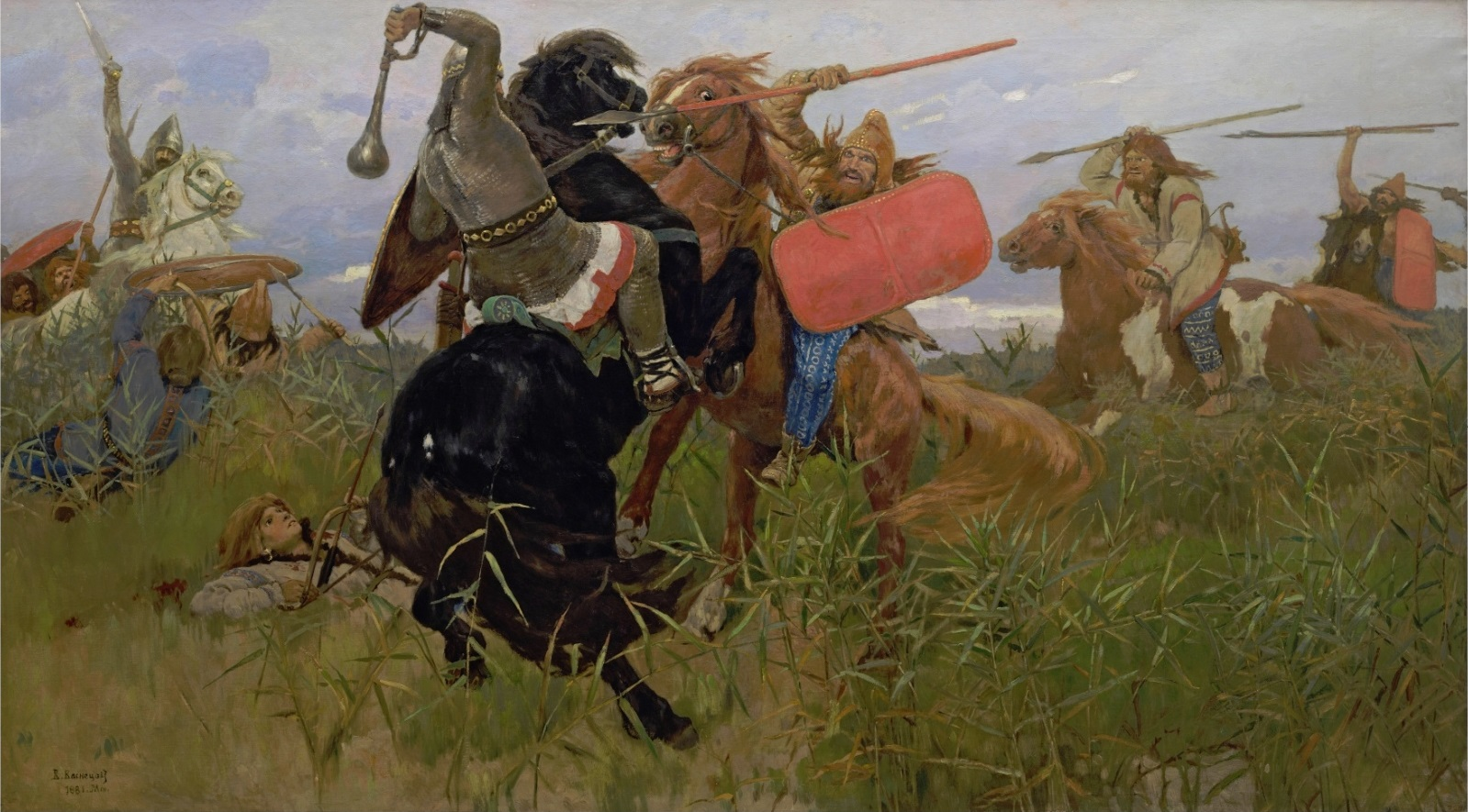
Battle between the Scythians and the Slavs (1881) by Viktor Vasnetsov

In the later 19th century, a cultural movement called Skifstvo (Russian: Скифство, lit. 'Scythianism') emerged in Russia whose members unreservedly referred to themselves and to Russians as a whole as Skify (Russian: Скифы, lit. 'Scythians'). Closely affiliated to the Left Socialist-Revolutionaries, the Skify were a movement of Russian nationalist religious mysticists who saw Russia as a sort of Messiah-like figure who would usher in a new historical era of the world, and their identification with the ancient Scythians was a positive acceptance of Dostoevsky's view that Europe had always seen Russians as being "Asiatic." The culmination of Skifstvo was the famous poem written in 1918 by Aleksandr Blok, titled Skify (Russian: Скифы, lit. 'The Scythians'), in which he depicted Russia as a barrier between the "warring races" of Europe and Asia, and he made use of the racist Yellow Peril ideology by threatening that Russia was capable of stopping its "protection" of Europe and allow East Asians to overrun it.

The scholar Adrienne Mayor hypothesised that the legend of the griffin originated among the Scythians, who came across fossilised skeletons of the dinosaur Protoceratops. This hypothesis was contested by the palaeontologist Mark P. Witton, who argued that the imagery of the griffin originated in early Bronze Age West Asia; the imagery of griffins in Scythian art itself was borrowed from the artistic traditions of West Asia and ancient Greece.

The scholar David Anthony has also hypothesised that the martial role of women among Scytho-Sarmatians had given rise to the Greek myths about Amazons. However, according to the Scythologist Askold Ivantchik, the imagery of the Amazons was already known to Homer and was originally unrelated to the Scythians, with the link between Scythians and Amazons in Greek literature beginning only later in the 5th century BC.

== Culture and society ==
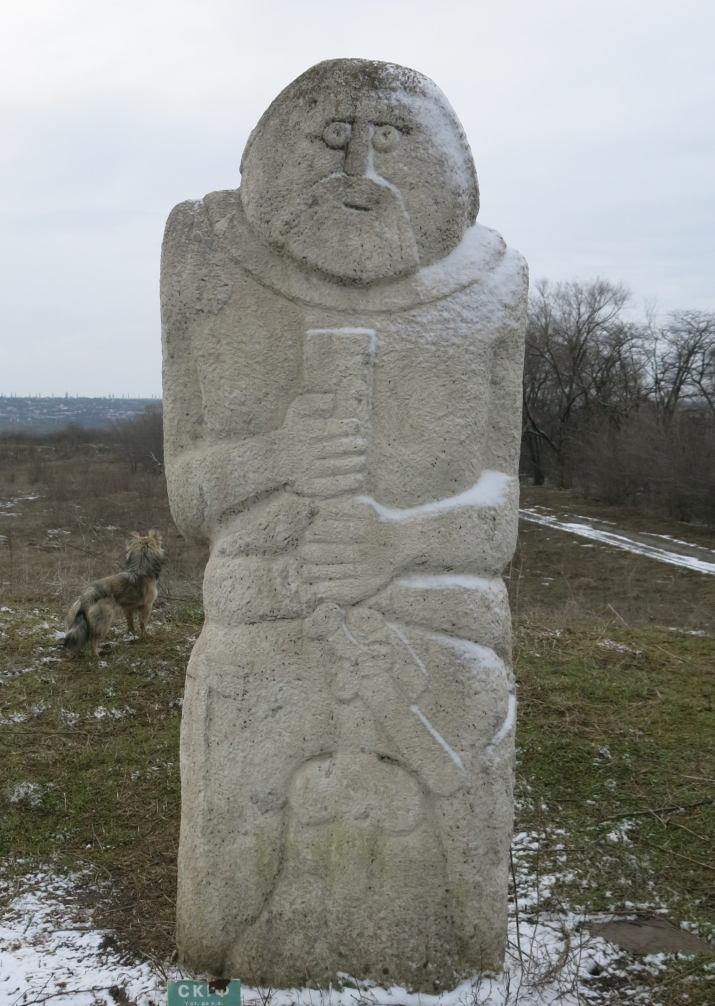
A Scythian stele Khortytsia, Ukraine

The Scythians were a member of the broader cultures of nomadic Iranic peoples living throughout the Eurasian steppe and possessed significant commonalities with them, such as similar weapons, horse harnesses and "Animal Style" art. The Scythians were a people from the Eurasian steppe, whose conditions required them to be pastoralists, which required mobility to find natural pastures, which in turn shaped every aspect of the Scythian nomads' lives, ranging from the structure of their habitations and the style of their clothing to how they cooked.

This nomadic culture depended on a self-sufficient economy whose own resources could provide for its sustainance, and whose central component was the horse, which could be used peacefully to barter for commodities and services or belligerently in a form of warfare which provided nomadic fighters superiority until the creation of firearms. Since the Scythians did not have a written language, their non-material culture can only be pieced together through writings by non-Scythian authors, parallels found among other Iranic peoples, and archaeological evidence.

=== Language ===
The Scythians as well as the Saka of Central Asia spoke a group of languages belonging to the eastern branch of the Iranic language family. A specific feature of the language was the transformation of the sound /δ/ (/ð/) into /l/. The Scythian languages may have formed a dialect continuum: "Scytho-Sarmatian" in the west and "Scytho-Khotanese" or Saka in the east. The Scythian languages were mostly marginalised and assimilated as a consequence of the late antiquity and early Middle Ages Slavic and Turkic expansions. The western (Sarmatian) group of ancient Scythian survived as the medieval language of the Alans and eventually gave rise to the modern Ossetian language.

=== Social organisation ===
Scythian society constited of kinship structures where clan groups formed the basis of the community and of political organisation. Clan elders wielded considerable power and were able to depose kings. As an extension of clan-based relations, a custom of blood brotherhood existed among the Scythians.

Scythian society was stratified along class lines. By the 5th to 4th centuries BC, the Scythian population was stratified into five different class groups: the aristocracy, very wealthy commoners, moderately wealthy commoners, the peasantry, who were the producer class and formed the mass of the populace, and the poor. The Scythian aristocracy were an elite class dominating all aspects of Scythian life consisting of property owners who possessed landed estates large enough that it sometimes took a whole day to ride around them. These freeborn Scythian rulers used the whip as their symbol. Their burials were the largest ones, normally including between 3 and 11 human sacrifices, and showcasing luxury grave goods. The elite classes rewarded their dependants' loyalty through presents consisting of metal products whose manufacture was overseen by the elites themselves in the industrial centre located in the Scythian capital city at Kamianka.

The commoners were free but still depended to some extent on the aristocracy. They were allowed to own some property, usually a pair of oxen needed to pull a cart, hence why they were called oktapodes (Ancient Greek: ὀκτάποδες, lit. 'eight-feeters') in Greek. By the 4th century BC, the economic exploitation of these free commoners became the main economic policy of Scythia. The burials of these commoners were largely simple, and contained simpler furnishings and fewer grave goods. Serfs belonged to the poorest sections of the native populations of Scythia and were not free and did not own cattle or wagons. Stablemen and farmers were recruited from the serf class. Although Scythian society was not dependent on slavery, the Scythian ruling class nevertheless still used a large number of slaves to till the land and tend to the cattle. Slaves were also assigned to the production of dairy products.

The Scythian society was patriarchal; while women from the upper classes were free to ride horses, women from the lower classes may have not been free to do so and may have spent most of their time indoors. Among the more nomadic tribes, the women and children spent most of their time indoors in the wagons. With increased Sauromatian immigration in the late 6th century BC, among whom women held high social status, the standing of women improved enough that they were allowed to become warriors from the Middle Scythian period. Within Scythian priesthood there existed a group of soothsayers, called the Anarya (lit. 'unmanly'), who were born and lived their early lives as men, and later in their lives assumed the mannerisms and social roles of women. Polygamy was practised among the Scythian upper classes, and kings had harems in which both local women and women who had been bought lived. Some of these women were the kings' legal wives and others were their concubines. After the deaths of Scythian men, their main wives or concubines would be killed and buried alongside them. The wives and concubines could also be passed down as inheritance.

=== Administrative structure ===
The Scythians were organised into a tribal nomadic state with its own territorial boundaries, and comprising both pastoralist and urban elements. Such nomadic states were managed by institutions of authority presided over by the rulers of the tribes, the warrior aristocracy, and ruling dynasty. The Scythians were monarchical, and the king of all the Scythians was the main tribal chief, who was from the dominant tribe of the Royal Scythians. The historian and anthropologist Anatoly Khazanov has suggested that the Scythians had been ruled by the same dynasty from the time of their stay in West Asia until the end of their kingdom in the Pontic Steppe, while the Scythologist Askold Ivantchik has instead proposed that the Scythians had been ruled by at least three dynasties, including that of Bartatua, that of Spargapeithes, and that of Ariapeithes.

The Scythians were ruled by a triple monarchy, with a high king who ruled all of the Scythian kingdom, and two younger kings who ruled in sub-regions. The kingdom composed of three kingdoms which were in turn made of nomes headed by local lords. Ceremonies were held in each nome on a yearly basis. Such structures were also present among the ancient Xiongnu and the late nomadic Huns.

The Scythians were organised into popular and warrior assemblies that limited the power of the kings. Although the kings' powers were limited by these assemblies, royal power itself was held among the Scythians to be divinely ordained: this conception of royal power was initially foreign to Scythian culture and originated in West Asia. The Scythian kings were later able to further increase their position through the concentration of economic power in their hands because of their dominance of the grain trade with the Greeks. By the 4th century BC, the Scythian kingdom had developed into a rudimentary state after the king Ateas had united all the Scythian tribes under his personal authority.

Scythian kings chose members of the royal entourage from the tribes under his authority, who were to be killed and buried along with him after his death to serve him in the afterlife. Warriors belonging to the entourage of Scythian rulers were also buried in smaller and less magnificent tombs surrounding the tombs of the rulers.

== Economy ==
The dominant tribe of the Royal Scythians originally led a transhumant warrior-pastoralist nomadic way of life by spending the summer northwards in the steppes and moving southwards towards the coasts in the winter. With the integration of Scythia with the Greek colonies on the northern shore of the Black Sea, the Scythians also soon became involved in activities such as cultivating grain, fishing, trading and craftsmanship. Although the Scythians adopted the use of coinage as a method of payment for trade with the Greeks, they never used it for their own domestic market.

=== Pastoralism and agriculture ===
The Scythians practised animal husbandry, and their society was highly based on nomadic pastoralism, which was practised by both the sedentary and nomadic Scythian tribes, with their herds being made up of about 40% horses, 40% cattle, and 18% sheep, but no pigs, which the Scythians refused to keep in their lands. Horse rearing was especially an important part of Scythian life, not only because the Scythians rode them, but also because horses were a source of food. During the 1st millennium BC, the wet and damp climate prevailing in the Pontic Steppe constituted a propitious environment which caused grass to grow in abundance, in turn allowing the Scythians to rear large herds of horse and cattle.

Scythian pastoralism followed seasonal rhythm, moving closer to the shores of the Maeotian Sea in winter and back to the steppe in summer. The Scythians appear to have not stored food for their animals, who therefore likely foraged under the snow during winter. The strong reliance on pastoralism itself ensured self-sufficiency, the importance of which is visible in Scythian petroglyphic art. Hunting among the Scythians was primarily done for sport and entertainment rather than for procuring meat, although it was occasionally also carried out for food.

The settlements in the valley of the Borysthenēs river especially grew wheat, millet, and barley, which grew abundantly thanks to the fertile black soil of the steppe. This allowed the Scythians to, in addition to being principally reliant on domesticated animals, also complement their source of food with agriculture, and the Scythian upper classes owned large estates in which large numbers of slaves and members of the tribes subordinate to the Royal Scythians were used to till the land and rear cattle.

=== Metalworking ===
The populations of Scythia practised both metal casting and blacksmithing, with the same craftsmen usually both casting copper and bronze and forging iron. The ores from which copper and tin were smelted were likely mined in the region of the Donets Ridge, and metal might also have been imported from the Ural Mountains and the Caucasus. Iron was meanwhile smelted out of bog iron ores obtained from the swampy regions on the lower Dnipro. The Scythians had practised goldsmithing from before their migration out of Central Asia. This tradition of goldsmithing continued until the times of the Pontic Scythian kingdom.

The metallurgical workshops which produced the weapons and horse harnesses of the Scythians during the Early Scythian period were located in the forest steppe. By the Middle Scythian period, its principal centre was at a site corresponding to present-day Kamianka, where the whole process of manufacturing bog iron was carried out. Other metals, such as copper, lead, and zinc were also smelted at Kamianka, while gold- and silversmiths also worked there. This large-scale industrial operation consumed large amounts of timber which was obtained from the river valleys of Scythia, and metalworking might have developed at Kamianka because timber was available nearby.

=== Trade ===
The Scythians exported iron, grain and slaves to the Greek colonies, and animal products, grain, fish, honey, wax, forest products, furs, skins, wood, horses, cattle, sheep, and slaves to mainland Greece on both sides of the Aegean Sea. Also sold to the Greeks by the Scythians were beavers and beaver-skins, and rare furs that the Scythians had themselves bought from the populations living to their north and east such as the Thyssagetae and Iurcae of the Ural Mountains who hunted rare animals and sewed their skins into clothing. Other Scythian exports to Greece included the metallurgical production of Kamianka, Scythian horses, and Scythian mercenary mounted archers.

The most important export was grain, especially wheat, The importance of the Black Sea coast increased in the later 6th century BC following the Persian Empire's conquest of Egypt, which deprived the states of Greece proper of the Egyptian grain that they depended on. The relations between the Scythians and the Greek colonies became more hostile in the early 5th century BC, with the Scythians destroying the Greek cities' khōrai and rural settlements, and therefore their grain-producing hinterlands. The resulting system saw the Greek colonies adjusting from agricultural production to trade of grain produced elsewhere. The Scythian monopoly over the trade of grain imported from the forest steppe to the Greek cities came to an end sometime between 435 and 400 BC, after which the Greek cities regained their independence and rebuilt their khōrai.

Beginning in the 5th century BC, the grain trade with Greece was carried out through the intermediary of the Bosporan kingdom. As a consequence of the Peloponnesian War, the Bosporan Kingdom became the main supplier of grain to Greece in the 4th century BC, which resulted in an increase of the trade of grain between the Scythians and the Bosporans. The Scythian aristocracy became the main intermediary in providing grain to the Bosporan Kingdom. Inscriptions from the Greek cities on the northern Black Sea coast also show that upper class Greek families also derived wealth from this trade.

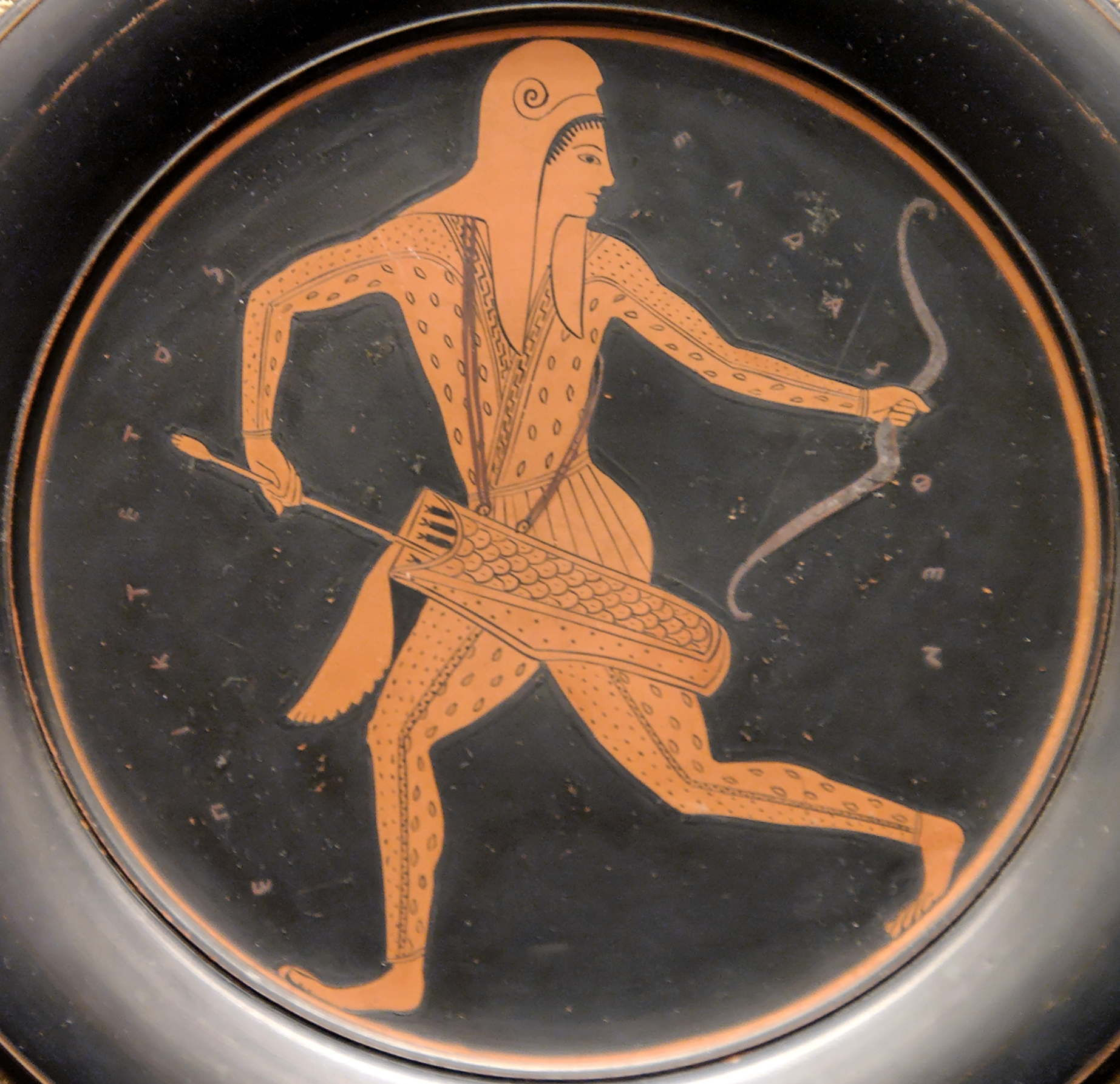
An Attic vase-painting of a Scythian archer (a police force in Athens) by Epiktetos, 520–500 BC

The Scythians also sold slaves acquired from neighbouring or subordinate tribes to the Greeks. The Greek colonies on the northern Black Sea coast were hubs of slave trafficking.

Beginning in the 7th and 6th centuries BC, the Scythians had been importing craft goods and luxuries such as vessels, decorations made from previous metals, bronze items, personal ornaments, gold and silver vases, black burnished pottery, carved semi-precious and gem stones, wines, fabrics, oil, and offensive and defensive weapons made in the workshops of Pontic Olbia or in mainland Greece, as well as pottery made by the Greeks of the Aegean islands.

The Scythians bought various Greek products, especially amphorae of wine, and the pottery such as oinokhoai and kylikes. The island of Chios in the Aegean Sea produced wine to be sold to the Scythians, in exchange of which slaves from Scythia were sold in the island's very prominent slave market. The Scythians also bought olive oil, perfumes, ointments, and other luxury goods from the Greeks, such as Scythian-style objects crafted by Greek artisans.

An important trade gold trade route ran through Pontic Scythia, starting from Pontic Olbia and reaching the Altai Mountains in the far east. Gold was traded from eastern Eurasia until Pontic Olbia through this route. The conquest of the north Pontic region and their imposition of a "Pax Scythica" created the conditions of safety for traders which enabled the establishment of this route. Olbian-made goods have been found on this route until the Ural Mountains. This trade route was another significant source of revenue for the Scythian rulers.

== Lifestyle ==
=== Nomads and pastoralists ===
The peoples of Scythia consisted of a mix of sedentary farmer populations and nomads. with the tribes living in the steppes remaining primarily nomadic and having lifestyles and customs inextricably linked to their nomadic way of life. During these early periods, the nomadic Scythians did not build settlements, but instead lived in wagons and temporary tents while leading a mobile pastoral life with their herds and wagon trains. With the integration of Scythia with the Greek colonies on the northern shore of the Black Sea, some of the nomadic Scythians started to settle down, so that they had already started becoming semi-nomads and sedentary farmers by the 5th century BC during the Middle period, and they had largely become settled farmers by the 3rd century BC.

The more nomadic Scythians lived in habitations suited for nomadic lifestyles, such as tents similar to the yurt of the Turkic peoples and the ger of the Mongolic peoples that could easily be assembled and disassembled, as well as covered wagons that functioned as tents on up to six wheels. The walls and floors of these portable habitations were made of felt and the tents themselves were bound together using ropes made from horse hair.

Beginning in the 5th and 4th centuries BC, the Scythians started building fortified sedentary settlements, of which the most important ones were located on major routes which provided access to the major rivers of Scythia. The largest and most important of these was the settlement of Kamianka, built in the late 5th century BC and protected by ramparts and steep banks of the Borysthenēs river. The Kamianka site was the location of the seasonal royal headquarters and the aristocrats and royalty residing in the city's acropolis, which contained stone houses and buildings built over stone foundations. It was also the residence of a farmer population and of metalsmiths. The houses of these farmers and metalsmiths were single-storeyed, with gable-rooves, ranged from 40 to 150 metres square in size and could include multiple rooms, and had clay-painted and felt-fabric adorned walls made of beams buried vertically in the ground; Kamianka also contained square pit houses made of pole constructions with recessed surfaces.

Smaller Scythian settlements also existed, where were cultivated large amounts of crops such as wheat, millet, and barley.

=== Diet ===
The Scythians ate the meat from the horses, cattle, and sheep they reared. Milk, especially that of mares, was also an important part of the Scythians' diet, and it was both consumed and used to make cheese and an alcoholic drink made from milk similar to the kumys still widely consumed by Eurasian steppe nomads. The Scythians also consumed wheat and millet in the form of a porridge. The Scythians also supplemented, to varying extents depending on the regions where they lived, their diets by hunting deer, steppe antelopes, beavers, and other wild animals, as well as by fishing from the large rivers flowing through Scythia. Cooking was mainly done in cauldrons and over fires using dried dung as fuel.

In addition to these, the Scythians consumed large amounts of wine, which they bought from the Greeks. Unlike the Greeks, who diluted wine with water before drinking it, the Scythians drank it undiluted. During the earlier phase of the Scythian Pontic kingdom, wine was primarily consumed by the aristocracy, and its consumption became more prevalent among the wealthier members of the populace only after the 5th century BC.

=== Clothing and medicine ===
Kul-Oba vase
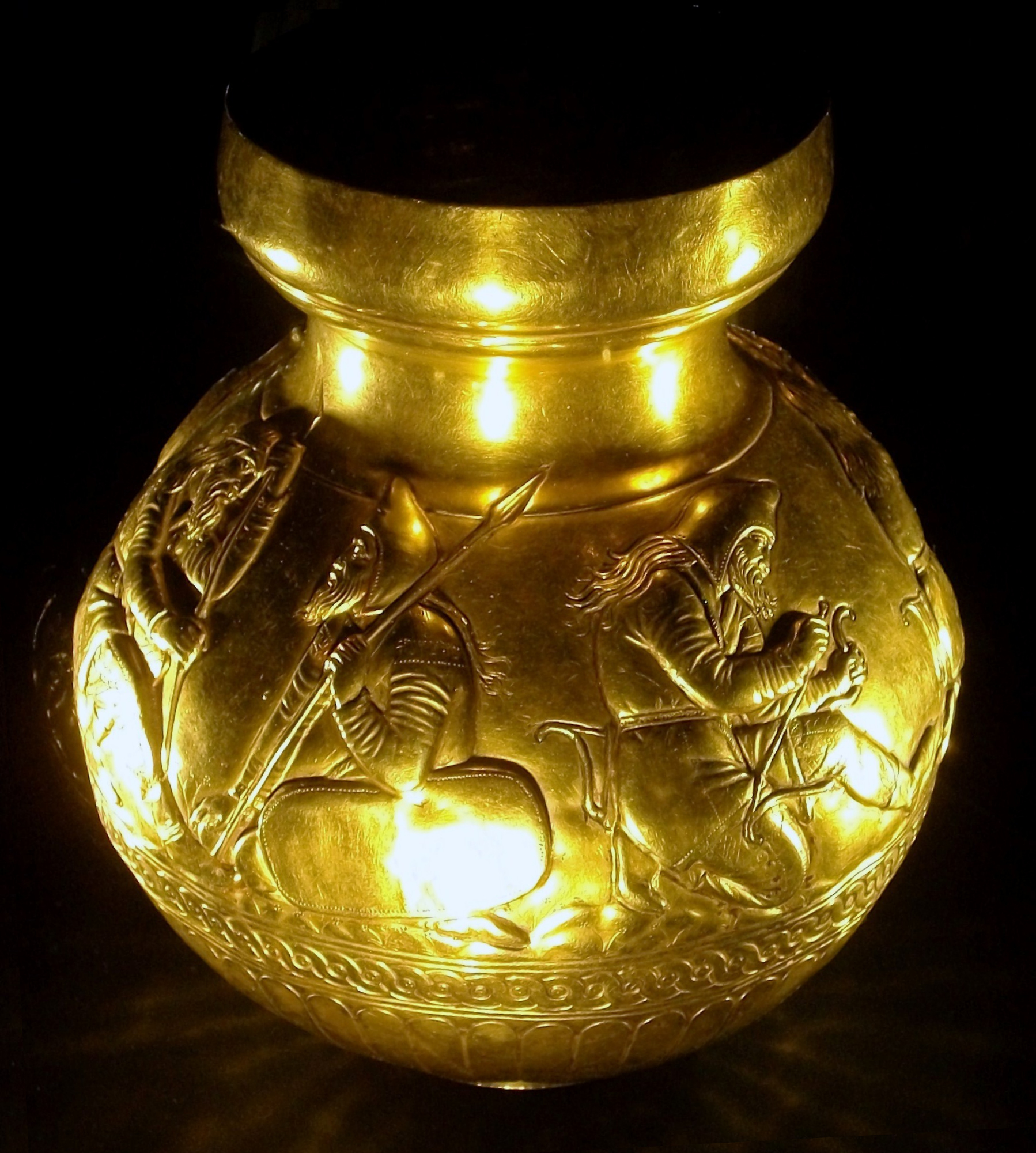
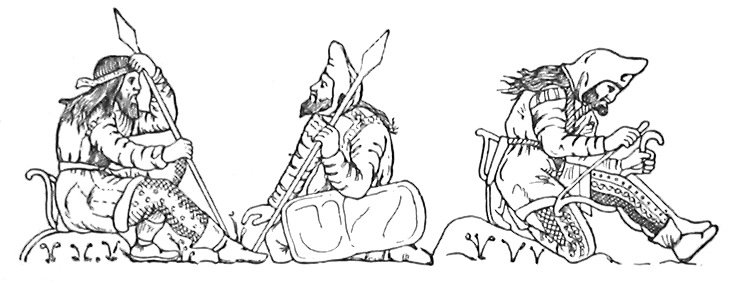
Scythian warriors, drawn after figures on an electrum cup from the Kul-Oba kurgan burial near Kerch, Crimea. The warrior on the right strings his bow, bracing it behind his knee; note the typical pointed hood, long jacket with fur or fleece trimming at the edges, decorated trousers, and short boots tied at the ankle. Scythians apparently wore their hair long and loose, and all adult men apparently bearded. The gōrytos appears clearly on the left hip of the bare-headed spearman. The shield of the central figure may be made of plain leather over a wooden or wicker base. (Hermitage Museum, St Petersburg).

Scythian garments were sewn together from several pieces of cloth, and generally did not require the use of fibulae to be held in place, unlike the clothing of other ancient European peoples. Scythian dress consisted of combination of various leathers and furs designed for efficiency and comfort on horseback, and was expensively and richly decorated with brightly coloured embroidery and applique work as well as facings of pearl and gold. The Scythians wore clothing typical of the steppe nomads, which tended to be soft, warm, and close-fitting, made from wool and leather and fur and felts, and decorated with appliquéd and golden ornaments. Scythians wore jewellery usually made of gold, but sometimes also of bronze.

Scythian men grew their hair and beards out, while the women's hairstyles are unknown. The Scythians used soap. Scythian women cleaned themselves with paste made from cypress and cedar wood, ground together with frankincense and water on a stone until it thickened. They removed the paste after a day, leaving their skin clean, glossy, and sweet-smelling. The women also used cosmetics such as scented water and ointments. These cleaning practices were especially performed after funerals. Scythians used mirrors, like bronze ones made in Pontic Olbia. Mirrors decorated with figures of animals were popular during the early Scythian periods.

A group of Scythian shaman-priests called the Agaroi (Ἄγαροι, Latin: Agari) was knowledgeable in the use of snake venom for medicinal purposes. Ingredients they used included cannabis, as a way to relieve pain, the analgesic oil of wild cabbage to stimulate circulation and to repel insects, and the cleansing paste used by Scythian women, which had various medicinal properties. In addition to human medicine, the Scythians were adept at veterinary medicine, especially for their horses, although they also domesticated dogs.

=== Art ===
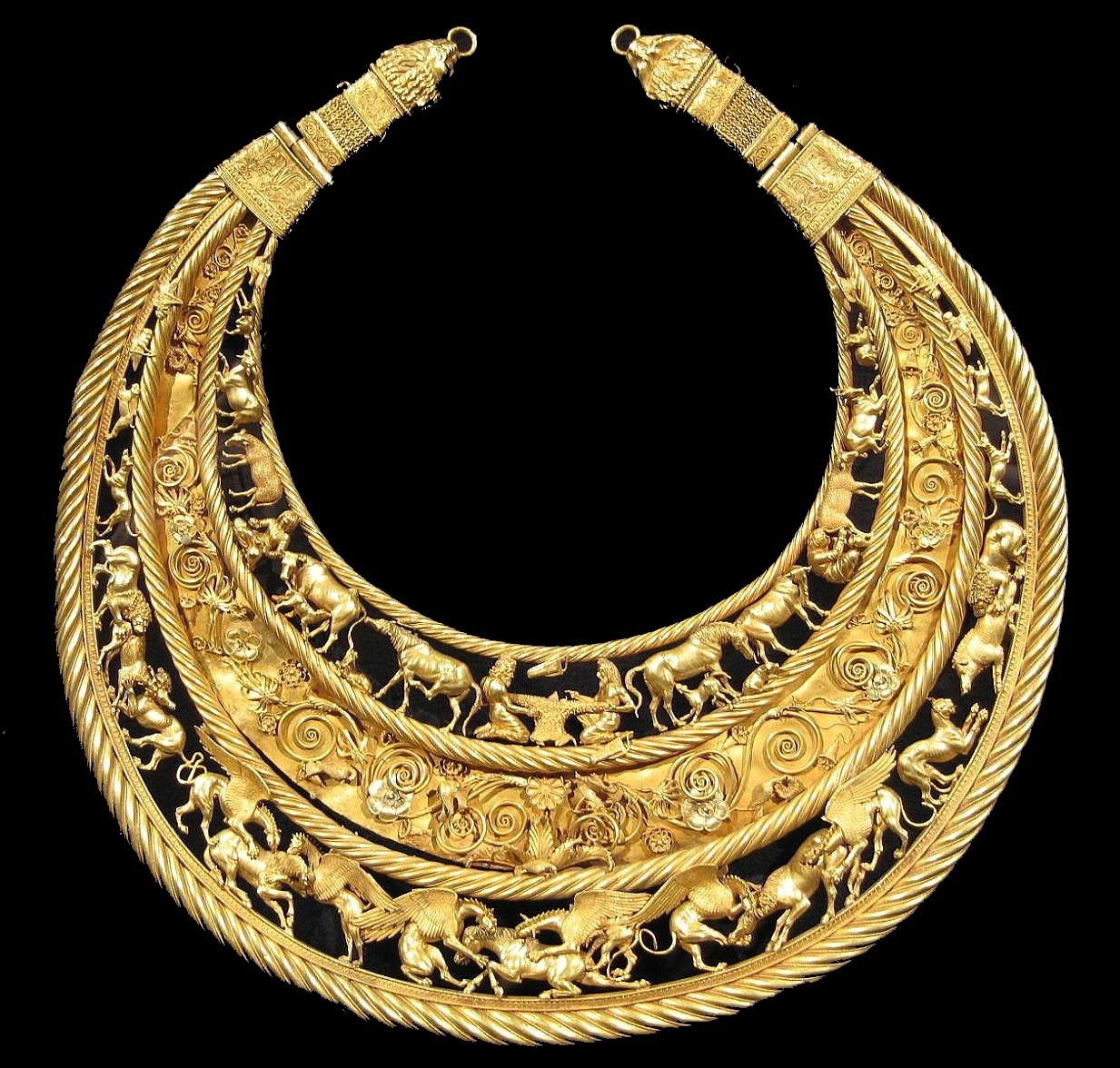
Gold pectoral, or neckpiece, from an aristocratic kurgan in Tovsta Mohyla, Pokrov, Ukraine, dated to the second half of the 4th century BC, of Greek workmanship. The central lower tier shows three horses, each being torn apart by two griffins. Scythian art was especially focused on animal figures.

The Scythians may have had bards who composed and recited oral poetry.

The physical art of the Scythians comprised part of the "Animal Style", where a specific range of animals were depicted in limited poses. The style descended from the artwork of Central Asia and Siberia during the 9th century BC. The "Animal Style" emerged in the 7th century BC, during their occupation of Media, due to which the art of the Scythians absorbed West Asian themes. Scythian art was then influenced by the Sauromatians, Thracian art, Greek, and Achaemenid Persian art. The "Animal Style" later spread to the west and eventually influenced Celtic art. It also introduced Shang Chinese metalwork, such as "cruciform tubes" used in harnesses, to the Hallstatt culture.

Scythian art stopped existing after the early 3rd century BC, and the art of the later Scythians of Crimea and Dobruja was completely Hellenised.

=== Religion ===
The religion of the Scythians was a variant of the Pre-Zoroastrian Iranic religion which belonged to a more archaic stage of Indo-Iranic religious development than the Zoroastrian and Hindu systems. Unlike the Persians and the Medes, the Scythians and the Sarmatians were not affected by the Zoroastrian reforms. The use of cannabis to induce trance and divination by soothsayers was a characteristic of the Scythian belief system.

== Warfare ==
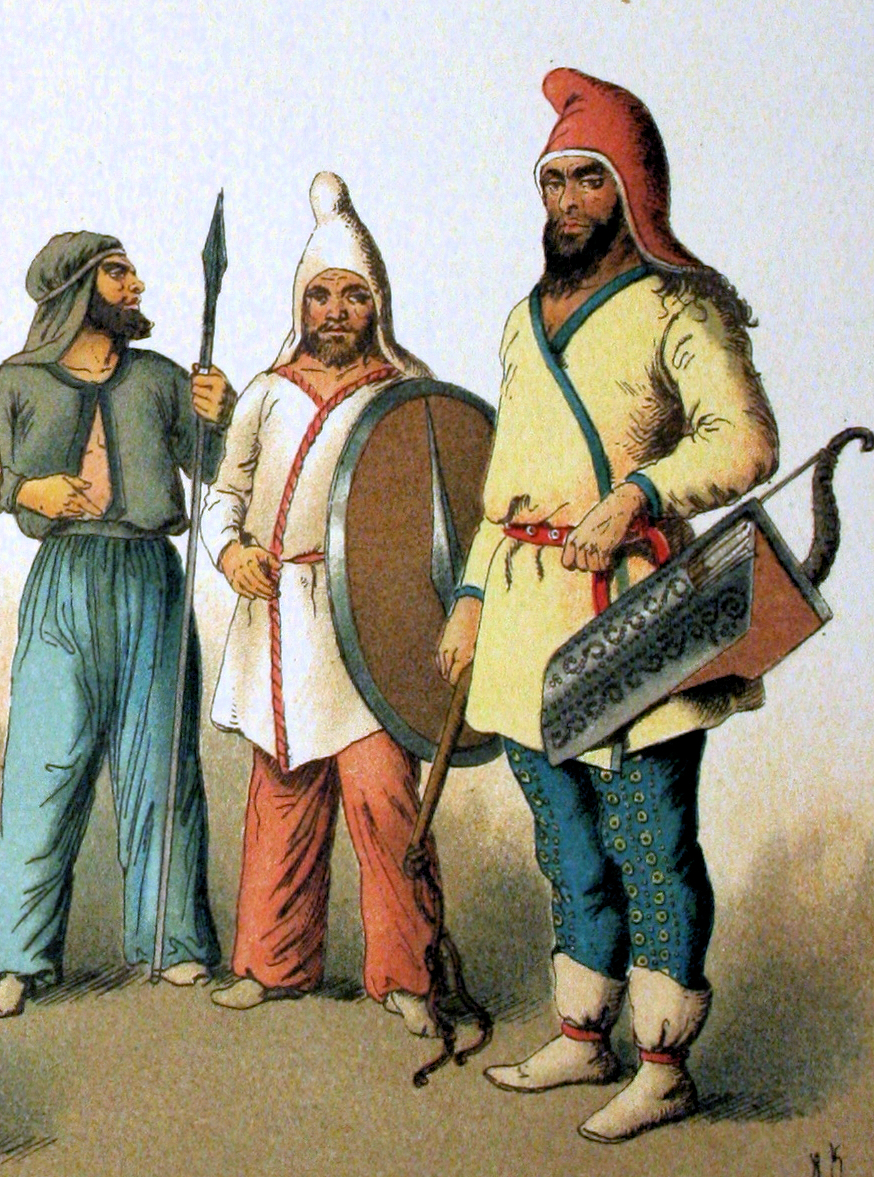
Scythian warriors (reconstruction)

The Scythians were a people with a strong warrior culture, and fighting was one of the main occupations of Scythian men, so that war constituted a sort of national industry for the Scythians. Scythian men were all trained in war exercises and in archery from a young age. The Aroteres were an especially war-like Scythian tribe. However, the small number of depictions of warfare compared to the number of representations of peaceful pastoralist activities in Scythian art suggests that their war-like tendencies of the Scythians might have been exaggerated.

=== Strategy and tactics ===
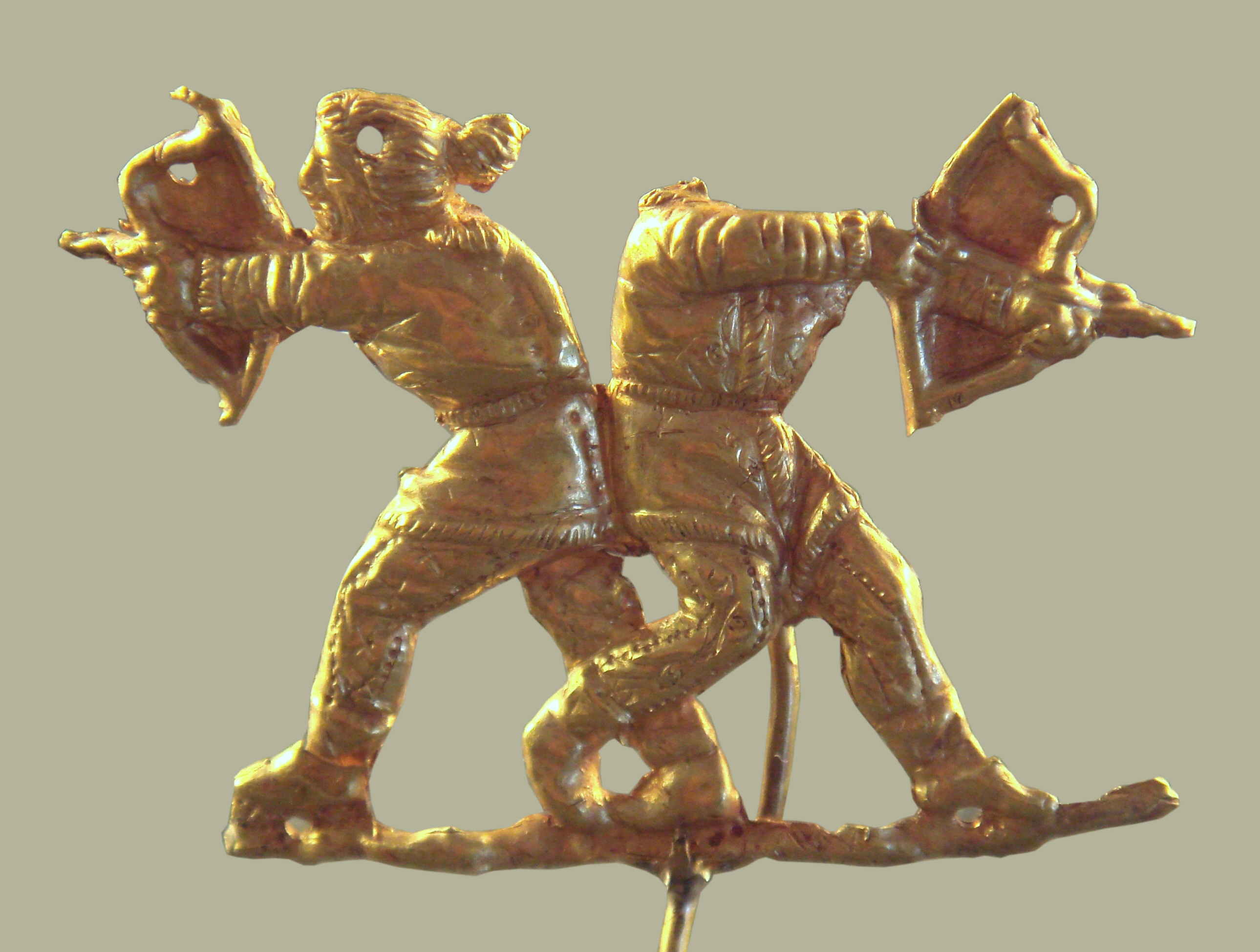
Scythian archers using the Scythian bow, Kerch (ancient Panticapeum), Crimea, 4th century BC. The Scythians were skilled archers whose style of archery influenced that of the Persians and subsequently other nations, including the Greeks.

As equestrian nomads, the Scythians excelled at horsemanship, and their horses were the most high quality in Europe. Mounted archery was the main form of Scythian warfare. The saddle was invented by the Scythians in the 7th century BC. Scythian saddles had four raised bolsters at each corner, which, before the invention of the stirrup, allowed the riders to raise themselves without being encumbered by their horses' bouncing, thus allowing Scythian mounted archers to operate at very high performance levels. Scythian saddles were dyed in various colours; they were also wholly decorated with wool, appliqué leather, felt, wooden carvings, and gold leaf. The high king had the supreme authority over the armies; the local lords were in charge of the army of a nome; the heads of clans were in charge of war bands. The nomes of the Scythian kingdom were in charge of spreading information about the war. The Scythians fought in mass formations of mounted archers and were adept at using feigned flight tactics. Serfs and slaves were subordinate to the warriors and accompanied them unarmed, and would be armed with spears only in extremely severe situations.

The Scythians had several war-related customs meant to transfer the power of defeated enemies to Scythian warriors. For example, every Scythian warrior would drink the blood of the first enemy they would kill. They collected the severed heads of their enemies and bring them to their king, where they were scalped. The scalps themselves were tanned and used as decorative handkerchiefs or towels, or fashioned into leather-covered drinking bowls. Meanwhile, enemy corpses were flayed, and the skin was made into saddles, while the skin and fingernails from the enemies' right hands was used to make gōrytoi.

=== Archery ===
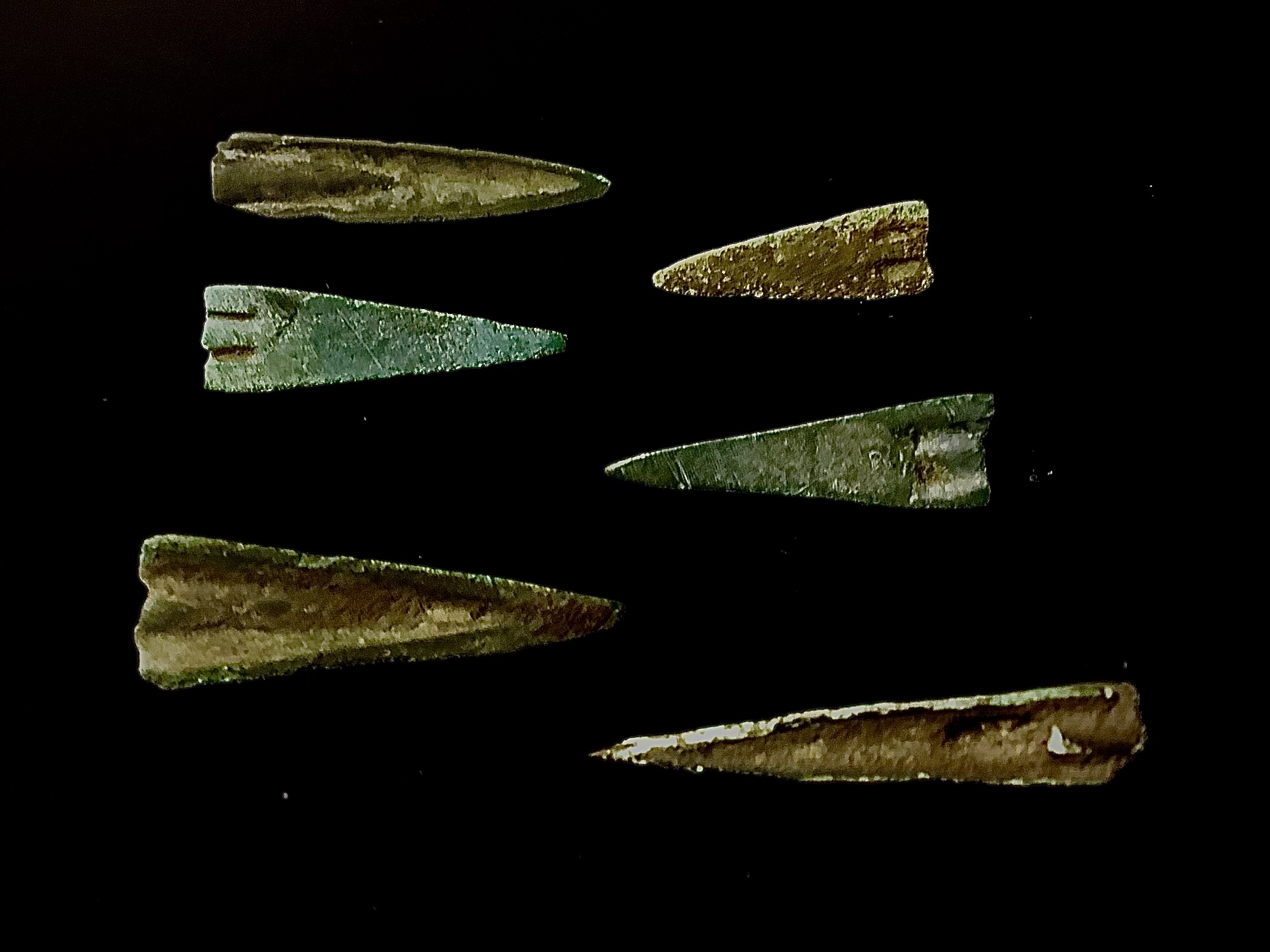
Scythian bronze arrowheads, c700-300 BC

Their typical weapon was the very recurved or reflex composite bow that was easy to use for mounted warriors. Scythian bows were the most complex composite bows in both their recurved profiles and their cross-sections, highly engineered and made from wood, horn, sinew, and sturgeon fish glue through laborious craftsmanship, and were capable of delivering military draw weights. Although the shape of Scythian arrows changed with time, they maintained a basic structure. Scythian arrows had shafts made of reed or birch wood, with arrowheads mostly of bronze, and more rarely iron and bone. The shape of Scythian bows and the shape of their bronze arrowheads made them the most powerful firing weapon of their time, due to which they were adopted by West Asian armies in the 7th century BC.

When not used, Scythian bows and arrows were kept in a combined quiver-bowcase called a gōrytos. Scythian gōrytoi hung from belts at the left hip, with the arrows usually taken using the bow hand and drawn on the bowstring using the right hand, although the Scythians were skilled at ambidextrous archery. Scythian bows and arrows might have required the use of thumb rings to be drawn, although none have been found yet, possibly because they might have been made of perishable materials.

The Scythians coated their arrows with a potent poison referred to in Greek as skythikon (Ancient Greek: σκυθικόν, romanized: skuthikón). To prepare this poison, the Scythians mixed decomposing adders with putefried human blood and dung. This combined snake venom and infections such as tetanus or gangrene from the dung, which thrived in the blood. Thus, the skythikon caused such lasting harm that even minor wounds from arrows coated were likely lethal. The skythikon was not used for hunting since the meat would not have been consumable. The rotting stench of the skythikon also functioned as chemical weapons, aided by the ancient belief that foul miasmas caused disease. Another poison used by the Scythians to coat their arrows was hemlock.

=== Other weapons and armour ===
In addition to the bow and arrow, the Scythians also used weapons such as iron spears, long swords, short swords borrowed from Georgian Bronze Age weaponry, bimetallic pickaxes, called sagaris, war axes, lances, darts, lassoes, and slings. The Scythians used locally made small hide or wicker or wooden shields reinforced with iron strips, often decorated with central plaques.

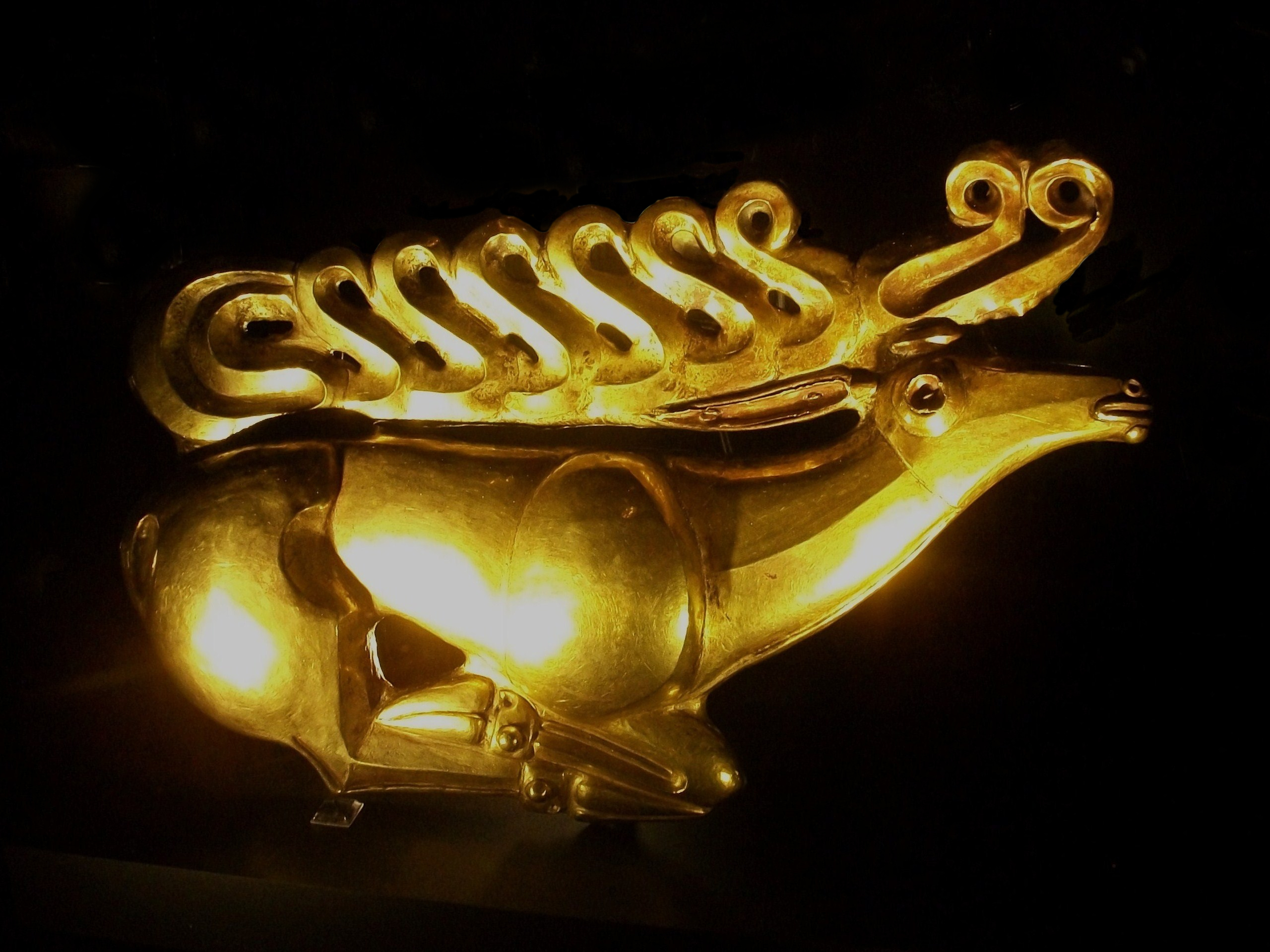
Golden decorative plate shaped like a stag from a Scythian shield

Golden decorative plate shaped like a panther from a Scythian shield

Some Scythian warriors wore rich protective armour and belts made of metal plates. Commoner warriors used leather or hide armour. Aristocrats used scale armour made of scales of bone, bronze, and iron sewn onto leather along the top edge. This style, also used to protect horses, had been borrowed from West Asia. Helmets were in various types: cast bronze helmets with an opening for the face, called "Kuban type," were made by the Caucasian peoples; these were replaced by Greek-made Attic, Corinthian, Chalcidic, and Thracian helmets in the 6th century BC; and composite scale helmets made of iron or bronze plates started being used in the later 6th century BC. Greek-made greaves were imported from the 5th century BC.

== Physical appearance ==
The Scythians looked similar to the populations of Europe, and depictions of Scythian men in Persian sculptures and on Scythian gold objects show them as stocky and powerfully built, with strong facial features and long and thick wavy hair.

The Greek physician Hippocrates described the Scythians as having "ruddy" skin, which he attributed to the cold climate in which they lived. Callimachus and Clement of Alexandria described the Scythians as having "light" (xanthon) hair, Polemon recorded that Scythians had "red" (rubris) hair and "blue-grey" (glaucis) eyes, Galen wrote that the northern peoples such as Germans, Illyrians, Dalmatians, Sarmatians and Scythians had "reddish" (purrhas) hair, and Adamantius claimed that the Scythians had "light" (xanthe) and "whitish" (hupoleukos) hair.

Upper-class Scythians were particularly tall, with the men usually being over 1.80 metres tall, sometimes reaching 1.90 metres, and on some rarer occasions being even more than 2 metres tall.

The difference in height between these upper-class Scythians and the Scythian commoners was of around 10 to 15 centimetres, with the height difference being a symbol of status among the upper-class men. Analysis of skeletons shows that Scythians had longer arm and leg bones and stronger bone formation than present-day people living in their former territories.

Due to his unfamiliarity with Scythian dress, Pseudo-Hippocrates inaccurately claimed that the Scythians suffered from hypermobility of the joints.

== Archaeology ==
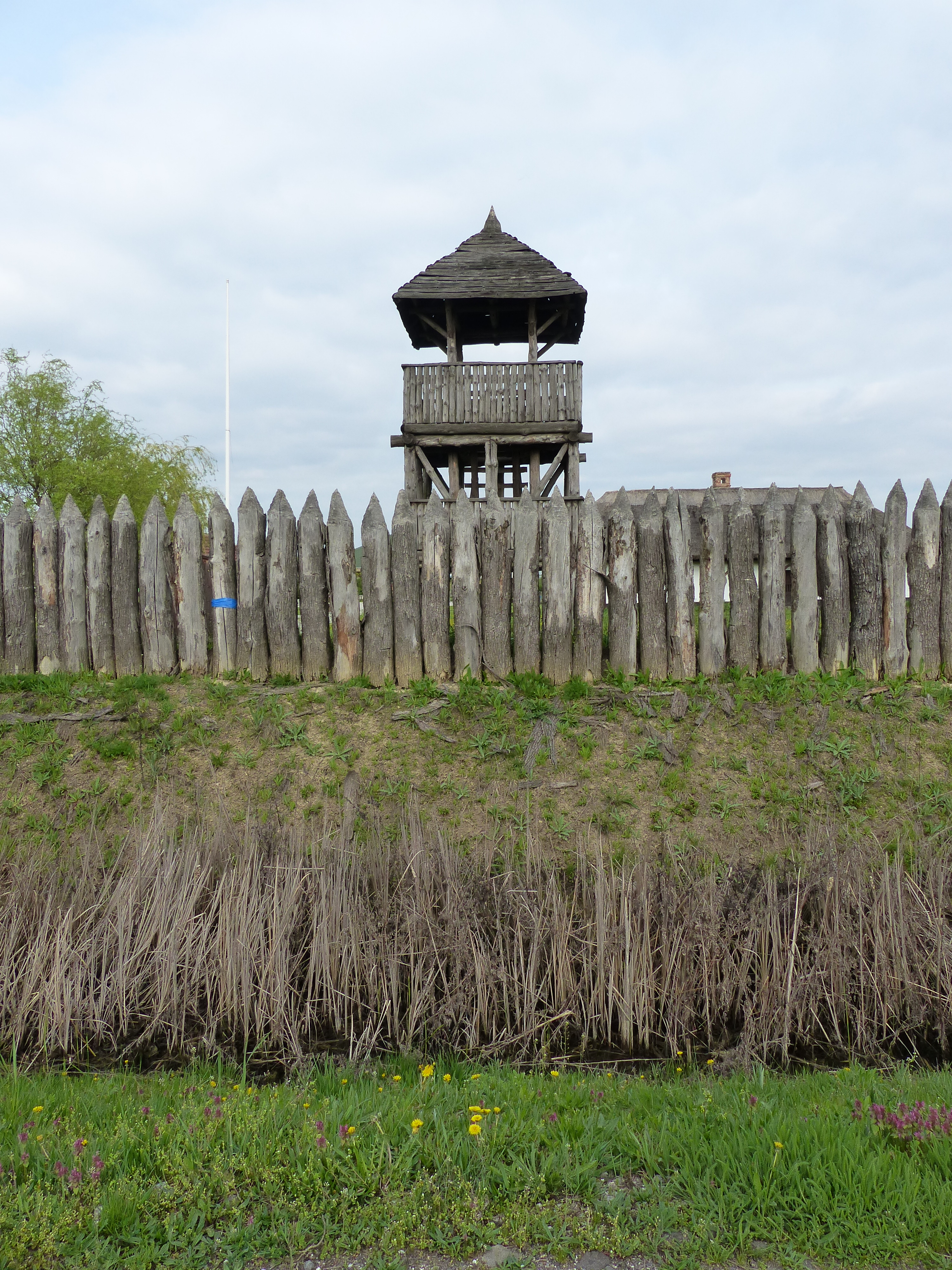
Scythian defence line 339 BC reconstruction in Polgár, Hungary

Scythian archaeology can be divided into three stages:

- Early Scythian – from the mid-8th or the late 7th century BC to c. 500 BC
- Classical Scythian or Mid-Scythian – from c. 500 BC to c. 300 BC
- Late Scythian – from c. 200 BC to the mid-3rd century AD, in the Crimea and the Lower Dnipro, by which time the population was settled.

Archaeological remains of the Scythians include barrow grave tombs called "kurgans" (ranging from simple exemplars to elaborate "Royal kurgans" containing the "Scythian triad" of weapons, horse-harness, and Scythian-style wild-animal art), gold, silk, and animal sacrifices, in places also with suspected human sacrifices.

Mummification techniques and permafrost have aided in the relative preservation of some remains. Scythian archaeology also examines the remains of cities and fortifications.

== Genetics ==
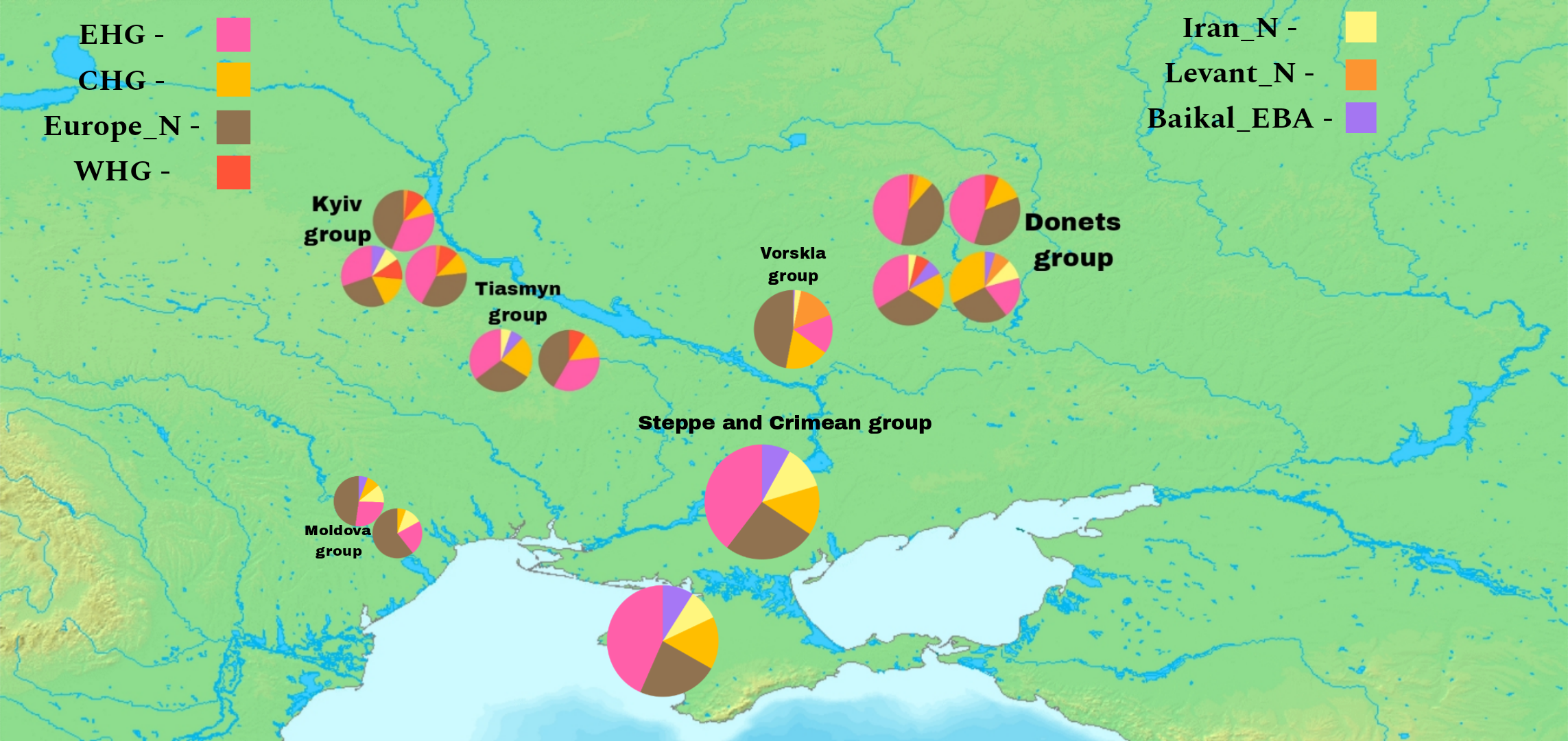
Autosomal DNA Western Scythians

The Scythians (specifically Western or Pontic Scythians, as in differentiation from Eastern Scythian Saka) primarily emerged from the Bronze and Iron Age population of the Pontic-Caspian and Central Asian Steppe (Western Steppe Herders or "Steppe_MLBA") associated with the Andronovo culture. Western Scythians carried diverse West Eurasian and East Eurasian maternal lineages. Initially, the Western Scythians carried only West Eurasian maternal haplogroups, but the frequency of East Eurasian haplogroups rises to 18–26% in samples dated from the 6th-2nd centuries BC. The East Eurasian maternal lineages were likely brought by individuals sharing affinities with modern-day Nganasan people, as well as the ancient Okunev culture. In terms of paternal haplogroups, most Western Scythian remains from the North Pontic region have been observed to carry a specific clade haplogroup R1a, as well as Q1a, R1b, I2a, J2a and E1b.

Saag, et al. (2025) examined the remains of Iron Age Scythians obtained from archaeological sites of the area stretching from the northern Black Sea coast to the Middle Donets and Middle Dnieper. Similarly to Moldovan and Hungarian Scythians, they were shown to carry admixture from earlier Lusatian, Hallstatt and Thracian ancestries. This Scythian-related gene pool remained generally homogeneous for almost 500 years, notwithstanding the sporadic presence of individuals of likely Ancient Northeast Asian ancestry represented by the Neolithic Devil's Gate Cave specimen, suggesting them to be recent migrants from further east.

Andreeva, et al. (2025) determined the paternal haplogroups of 36 Scythian males of the area stretching from the northern Black Sea coast to the Middle Don, dated the 7th century BC to the 1st century AD. 58.4% of the Y-DNA haplogroups belonged to varieties of haplogroup R1a (Y2631, Y934 and R-Y2) and R1b (R-Z2106). On the other hand, 22.2% belonged to haplogroup I2a (I-L801 and I-L702). The remaining individuals carried haplogroup G2a (G-S9409), J2a1 (J-Y26650 and J-FT72594), N1a (N-Z1934), and Q1a (Q-L940). Contrary to other more Eastern Scythian groups, these Pontic Scythian communities show continuity with different steppe-related Bronze Age groups, with minimal contributions from the Northeast Asian population represented by Khövsgöl LBA lineage. Specifically, the earliest Scythians, dating to the 7th to 5th centuries BC, overwhelmingly descended from the Andronovo culture populations, while later Scythians were closely associated with preceding steppe-related groups of Srubnaya culture and can be modeled as direct descendants of them. Among present-day Europeans, Scythians shared the highest levels of alleles with modern Eastern Baltic (Lithuanian, Estonian) and Northwestern Russian populations. Similarly, the Scythian maternal haplogroups are mostly found in modern carriers from Europe, predominantly in Poland, Denmark, and the northwestern part of Russia.

Most of the Scythians were predicted to have brown or blond hair, with a notable proportion of blue-eyed individuals. Several Scythians had MC1R gene variants associated with red hair, freckles, and skin with a tendency to sunburn.

== List of rulers ==
The relationships of the various Scythian kings with each other are not known for certain, although the historian and anthropologist Anatoly Khazanov suggests that the Scythians had been ruled by the same dynasty from the time of their stay in West Asia until the end of their kingdom in the Pontic steppe, and that Madyes and the later Scythian kings Spargapeithes and Ariapeithes belonged to the same dynasty, and Ellis Minns suggested in 1913 that Idanthyrsus was probably the father of Ariapeithes.

Meanwhile, the scholar Askold Ivantchik instead considers Madyes, Spargapeithes, and Ariapeithes to have each belonged to a different dynasty.

=== Kings of Early Scythians ===
- Išpakāya (Scythian: *Spakāya), r. unknown – 679 BC
- Bartatua (Scythian: *Pr̥ϑutavah or *Pr̥tatavah), r. 679 – c. 665 BC
- Madyes (Median: *Mādava), r. c. 650 – 625 BC

=== Kings of Pontic Scythians ===
- Spargapeithes (Scythian: *Spargapaiϑah), r. c. 610 BC
- Lykos (Scythian: *Lū̆ka), r. c. 600 BC
- Gnouros, r. c. 575 BC
- Sauaios or Saulios, r. c. 550 BC
- Idanthyrsus (Scythian: *Hiϑāmϑrauša), r. c. 530 – c. 510 BC

Sub-kings:
- Scopasis, r. c. 513 BC
- Taxacis (Scythian: *Taxšaka), r. c. 513 BC

- Argotas ?, r. c. 510 – c. 490 BC
- Ariapeithes (Scythian: *Aryapaiϑah), r. c. 490 – c. 460 BC
- Scyles (Scythian: *Skula), r. c. 460 – c. 450 BC
- Octamasadas (Scythian: *Uxtamazatā), r. c. 450 – c. 430 BC
- Eminakes ? (Scythian: *Aminaka), r. c. 420 BC ?
- Ateas or Ataias (Scythian: *Haϑaiya), r. c. 360s – 339 BC
- king with unrecorded name, r. c. 325 BC
- Agaros, r. c. 310 BC

== See also ==
- Saint Mercurius
- Early Slavs
- Eurasian nomads
- Nomadic empire
- Sarmatians

== Sources ==
- Adalı, Selim Ferruh (2017). "Cimmerians and the Scythians: the Impact of Nomadic Powers on the Assyrian Empire and the Ancient Near East". In Kim, Hyun Jin; Vervaet, Frederik Juliaan; Adalı, Selim Ferruh (eds.). Eurasian Empires in Antiquity and the Early Middle Ages Contact and Exchange between the Graeco- Roman World, Inner Asia and China. Cambridge: Cambridge University Press. pp. 60–82. ISBN 978-1-107-19041-2.
- Adalı, Selim Ferruh (2023). "The Phantom Menace? The Chronology of Cimmerian Expeditions, Territories and Zones of Influence in Anatolia". In Draycott, Catherine M.; Branting, Scott; Lehner, Joseph W.; Özarslan, Yasemin (eds.). From Midas to Cyrus and Other Stories: Papers on Iron Age Anatolia in Honour of Geoffrey and Françoise Summers. BIAA Monograph Series. London, United Kingdom: British Institute at Ankara. pp. 209–228. ISBN 978-1-912-09011-2.
- Alekseyev, Andrey Yu. [in Russian] (2005). "Scythian Kings and 'Royal' Burial-Mounds of the Fifth and Fourth Centuries BC". In Braund, David (ed.). Scythians and Greeks: Cultural Interaction in Scythia, Athens and the Early Roman Empire (sixth Century BC - First Century AD). Exeter, United Kingdom: University of Exeter Press. pp. 39–56. ISBN 978-0-859-89746-4. Archived from the original on 24 September 2024.
- Anthony, David W. (2007). The Horse, the Wheel, and Language How Bronze-Age Riders from the Eurasian Steppes Shaped the Modern World. Princeton, United States; Oxford, United Kingdom: Princeton University Press. ISBN 978-0-691-14818-2.
- Armbruster, Barbara (2009). "Gold technology of the ancient Scythians – gold from the kurgan Arzhan 2, Tuva". ArchéoSciences - Revue d'Archéométrie [ArchaeoSciences - Journal of Archaeometry] (in French). 33 (33): 187–193. doi:10.4000/archeosciences.2193. ISSN 1960-1360.
- Barnett, R. D. (1991). "Urartu". In Boardman, John; Edwards, I. E. S.; Hammond, N. G. L.; Sollberger, E. (eds.). The Prehistory of the Balkans; and the Middle East and the Aegean world, tenth to eighth centuries B.C. The Cambridge Ancient History. Vol. 3. Cambridge, United Kingdom: Cambridge University Press. pp. 314–371. ISBN 978-1-139-05428-7.
- Barnett, R. D. (1982). "Urartu". In Boardman, John; Edwards, I. E. S.; Hammond, N. G. L.; Sollberger, E. (eds.). The Prehistory of the Balkans; and the Middle East and the Aegean world, tenth to eighth centuries B.C. The Cambridge Ancient History. Vol. 3. Cambridge, United Kingdom: Cambridge University Press. pp. 314–371. ISBN 978-1-139-05428-7.
- Bassin, Mark (2012). "Asia". In Rzhevsky, Nicholas (ed.). The Cambridge Companion to Modern Russian Culture. Cambridge, United Kingdom: Cambridge University Press. pp. 57–84. ISBN 978-1-139-03035-9.
- Batty, Roger (2007). Rome and the Nomads: The Pontic-Danubian Realm in Antiquity. Oxford, United Kingdom: Oxford University Press. ISBN 978-0-198-14936-1.
- Baumer, Christoph (26 August 2021). At the Crossroads of Empires. History of the Caucasus. Vol. 1. Bloomsbury Publishing. ISBN 978-0-7556-3969-4.
- Bouzek, Jan [in Hungarian] (2001). "Cimmerians and Early Scythians: the Transition from Geometric to Orientalising Style in the Pontic Area". In Tsetskhladze, G.R. (ed.). North Pontic Archaeology: Recent Discoveries and Studies. Leiden, Netherlands: Brill Publishers. pp. 33–44. ISBN 978-9-004-12041-9.
- Braund, David (2021). "Heracles' Footprint by the River Tyras: Immortality and Acculturation on the Geto-Scythian Frontier". In Braund, David; Stolba, Vladimir F.; Peter, Ulrike (eds.). Environment and Habitation around the Ancient Black Sea. Berlin, Germany: De Gruyter. pp. 177–194. doi:10.1515/9783110715972-010. ISBN 978-3-110-71570-5. S2CID 236581183. Archived from the original on 28 May 2023.
- "What do false beards, weed saunas and cheese have in common?". British Museum Blog. British Museum. 2017. Archived from the original on 21 June 2021.
- Bukharin, Mikhail Dmitrievich [in Russian] (2013). "Колаксай и его братья (античная традиция о происхождении царской власти у скифов" [Kolaxais and his Brothers (Classical Tradition on the Origin of the Royal Power of the Scythians)]. Аристей: вестник классической филологии и античной истории [Aristaeus: Journal of Classical Philology and Ancient History] (in Russian). 3: 20–80.
- Burns, Thomas S. (2003). Rome and the Barbarians, 100 B.C.–A.D. 400. Baltimore, United States: Johns Hopkins University Press. ISBN 978-0-801-87306-5.
- Cunliffe, Barry (2019). The Scythians: Nomad Warriors of the Steppe. Oxford: Oxford University Press. ISBN 978-0-198-82012-3.
- Dandamayev, Muhammad (1994). "Media and Achaemenid Iran". In Harmatta, János Harmatta (ed.). History of Civilizations of Central Asia: The Development of Sedentary and Nomadic Civilizations, 700 B. C. to A. D. 250. Vol. 1. UNESCO. pp. 35–64. ISBN 92-3-102846-4.
- Dandamayev, M.; Medvedskaya, Inna [in Russian] (2006). "Media". Encyclopædia Iranica. New York City, United States: Encyclopædia Iranica Foundation; Brill Publishers. Archived from the original on 26 October 2023.
- Rozwadowski, Andrzej [in Polish] (2018). David, Bruno; McNiven, Ian J. (eds.). The Oxford Handbook of the Archaeology and Anthropology of Rock Art. Oxford University Press. pp. 151–176. ISBN 978-0-19-060735-7.
- Day, John V. (2001). Indo-European Origins: The Anthropological Evidence. Institute for the Study of Man. ISBN 0-941694-75-5.
- Diakonoff, I. M. (1985). "Media". In Gershevitch, Ilya (ed.). The Median and Achaemenian Periods. The Cambridge History of Iran. Vol. 2. Cambridge, United Kingdom: Cambridge University Press. ISBN 978-0-521-20091-2.
- Di Cosmo, Nicola (1999). "The Northern Frontier in Pre-Imperial China (1,500 – 221 BC)". In Loewe, Michael; Shaughnessy, Edward L. (eds.). The Cambridge History of China. Cambridge, United Kingdom: Cambridge University Press. pp. 885–996. ISBN 0-521-47030-7. Archived from the original on 16 November 2021.
- Dugaw, Sean; Lipschits, Oded; Stiebel, Guy D. (2020). "A New Typology of Arrowheads from the Late Iron Age and Persian Period and Its Historical Implications". Israel Exploration Journal. 70 (1): 64–89. JSTOR 27100276. Archived from the original on 6 June 2023.
- Fol, Alexander; Hammond, N. G. L. (1988). "Persia in Europe, Apart from Greece". In Boardman, John; Hammond, N. G. L.; Lewis, D. M.; Ostwald, M. (eds.). Persia, Greece and the Western Mediterranean, c. 525 to 479 B.C. The Cambridge Ancient History. Vol. 4. Cambridge: Cambridge University Press. pp. 234–253. ISBN 978-0-521-22804-6.
- Fuchs, Andreas [in German] (2023). "The Medes and the Kingdom of Mannea". In Radner, Karen; Moeller, Nadine; Potts, Daniel T. (eds.). The Age of Assyria. The Oxford History of the Ancient Near East. Vol. 4. New York City, United States: Oxford University Press. pp. 674–768. ISBN 978-0-190-68763-2.
- Gleba, Margarita (2008). "You Are What You Wear: Scythian Costume as Identity". In Gleba, Margarita; Nosch, Marie-Louise; Munkholt, Cherine (eds.). Dressing the Past (PDF). Oxford, United Kingdom: Oxbow Books. pp. 13–28. ISBN 978-1-782-97472-7. Archived (PDF) from the original on 6 June 2023.
- Grayson, A. K. [in German] (1991a). "Assyria: Sennacherib and Esarhaddon". In Boardman, John; Edwards, I. E. S.; Hammond, N. G. L.; Sollberger, E.; Walker, C. B. F. (eds.). The Assyrian and Babylonian Empires and other States of the Near East, from the Eighth to the Sixth Centuries B.C. The Cambridge Ancient History. Vol. 3. Cambridge, United Kingdom: Cambridge University Press. pp. 103–141. ISBN 978-1-139-05429-4.
- Grayson, A. K. [in German] (1991c). "Assyria 668-635 B.C.: the reign of Ashurbanipal". In Boardman, John; Edwards, I. E. S.; Hammond, N. G. L.; Sollberger, E.; Walker, C. B. F. (eds.). The Assyrian and Babylonian Empires and other States of the Near East, from the Eighth to the Sixth Centuries B.C. The Cambridge Ancient History. Vol. 3. Cambridge, United Kingdom: Cambridge University Press. pp. 142–161. ISBN 978-1-139-05429-4.
- Grousset, René (1970). The Empire of the Steppes: A History of Central Asia. Translated by Walford, Naomi. New Brunswick, United States: Rutgers University Press. ISBN 978-0-813-51304-1.
- Harmatta, János (1996). "10.4.1. The Scythians". In Hermann, Joachim; Zürcher, Erik; Harmatta, János; Litvak, J. K.; Lonis, R. [in French]; Obenga, T.; Thapar, R.; Zhou, Yiliang [in Chinese] (eds.). From the Seventh Century B.C. to the Seventh Century A.D. History of Humanity. Vol. 3. London, United Kingdom; New York City, United States; Paris, France: Routledge; UNESCO. pp. 181–182. ISBN 978-9-231-02812-0.
- Harmatta, János (1999). "Alexander the Great in Central Asia". Acta Antiqua Academiae Scientiarum Hungaricae. 39 (1–4): 129–136. doi:10.1556/aant.39.1999.1-4.11. S2CID 162246561. Archived from the original on 8 August 2022.
- Hartley, Charles W.; Yazicioğlu, G. Bike; Smith, Adam T. (2012). The Archaeology of Power and Politics in Eurasia: Regimes and Revolutions. Cambridge University Press. ISBN 978-1-107-01652-1.
- Hawkins, J. D. [in German] (1991). "The Neo-Hittite States in Syria and Anatolia". In Boardman, John; Edwards, I. E. S.; Hammond, N. G. L.; Sollberger, E. (eds.). The Prehistory of the Balkans; and the Middle East and the Aegean world, tenth to eighth centuries B.C. The Cambridge Ancient History. Vol. 3. Cambridge, United Kingdom: Cambridge University Press. pp. 372–441. ISBN 978-1-139-05428-7.
- Hinz, Walther [in German] (1975). Altiranisches Sprachgut der Nebenüberleiferung [Old Iranian Language from Collateral Sources] (in German). Wiesbaden, Germany: Harrassowitz. ISBN 3-447-01703-1.
- Hughes, Dennis D. (1991). Human Sacrifice in Ancient Greece. Psychology Press. ISBN 0-415-03483-3.|
- Irslinger, Britta (2017). "Geographies of Identity: Celtic Philology and the Search for Origins in Ireland and Germany". In Grage, Joachim; Mohnike, Thomas (eds.). Geographies of Knowledge and Imagination in 19th Century Philological Research on Northern Europe. Newcastle upon Tyne, United Kingdom: Cambridge Scholars Publishing. pp. 174–218. ISBN 978-1-527-50043-3. Archived from the original on 9 June 2023.
- Ivantchik, Askold (1993a). Les Cimmériens au Proche-Orient [The Cimmerians in the Near East] (PDF) (in French). Fribourg, Switzerland; Göttingen, Germany: Éditions Universitaires Fribourg (Switzerland); Vandenhoeck & Ruprecht (Germany). ISBN 978-3-727-80876-0. Archived (PDF) from the original on 13 August 2022.
- Ivantchik, Askold (1993b). "LES GUERRIERS-CHIENS: Loups-garous et invasions scythes en Asie Mineure" [The Dog Warriors: Werewolves and Scythian invasions in Asia Minor]. Revue de l'histoire des religions [Review of the History of Religions]. 210 (3): 305–330. doi:10.3406/rhr.1993.1478. JSTOR 23671794.
- Ivantchik, Askold (1999a). "The Scythian 'Rule Over Asia': the Classical Tradition and the Historical Reality". In Tsetskhladze, G.R. (ed.). Ancient Greeks West and East. Leiden, Netherlands: Brill. pp. 497–520. ISBN 978-9-004-11190-5. Archived from the original on 14 August 2023.
- Ivantchik, Askold (1999c). "The Scythian 'Rule Over Asia': the Classical Tradition and the Historical Reality". In Tsetskhladze, G.R. (ed.). Ancient Greeks West and East. Leiden, Netherlands: Brill. pp. 497–520. ISBN 978-9-004-11190-5. Archived from the original on 14 August 2023.
- Ivantchik, Askold (2001). "The Current State of the Cimmerian Problem". Ancient Civilizations from Scythia to Siberia. 7 (3): 307–339. doi:10.1163/15700570152758043.
- Ivantchik, Askold I. (2005). Накануне колонизации. Северное Причерноморье и степные кочевники VIII – VII вв. до н.э. в античной литературной традиции: фольклор, литература и история [On the eve of Colonisation. The Northern Black Sea Region and the Steppe Nomads of the 8th - 7th centuries BC in the Ancient Literary Tradition: Folklore, Literature and History]. Berlin, Germany; Moscow, Russia: Eurasien-Abteilung des Deutschen Archäologischen Instituts (Germany); Центр сравнительного изучения древних цивилизаций Института всеобщей истории РАН (Russia); Paleograph Press. ISBN 978-5-895-26015-9. Archived from the original on 24 September 2024.
- Ivantchik, Askold (2006). "Reconstructing Cimmerian and Early Scythian History: The Written Sources". In Aruz, Joan; Farkas, Ann; Fino, Elisabetta Valtz (eds.). The Golden Deer of Eurasia: Perspectives on the Steppe Nomads of the Ancient World. New Haven, United States; New York City, United States; London, United Kingdom: The Metropolitan Museum of Art; Yale University Press. pp. 146–153. ISBN 978-1-588-39205-3.
- Ivantchik, Askold I. (2016). "L'idéologie royale des Scythes et son expression dans la littérature et l'iconographie grecques: l'apport de la numismatique" [The Royal Ideology of the Scythians and its Expression in Greek Literature and Iconography: the Contribution of Numismatics]. Dialogues d'histoire ancienne [Dialogues of Ancient History] (in French). 42 (1): 305–329. Archived from the original on 17 May 2023.
- Ivantchik, Askold (2018). "Scythians". Encyclopædia Iranica. New York City, United States: Encyclopædia Iranica Foundation; Brill Publishers. Archived from the original on 17 August 2022.
- Jacobson, Esther (1995). The Art of the Scythians: The Interpenetration of Cultures at the Edge of the Hellenic World. Handbuch der Orientalistik. Leiden, Netherlands: Brill Publishers. ISBN 978-9-004-09856-5.
- Järve, Mari (22 July 2019). "Shifts in the genetic landscape of the western Eurasian steppe associated with the beginning and end of the Scythian dominance". Current Biology. 29 (14): 2430–2441. Bibcode:2019CBio...29E2430J. doi:10.1016/j.cub.2019.06.019. PMID 31303491.
- Jettmar, Karl (1971). "Metallurgy in the Early Steppes" (PDF). Artibus Asiae. 33 (1): 5–16. doi:10.2307/3249786. JSTOR 3249786. Archived (PDF) from the original on 17 May 2023.
- Kõiv, Mait [in Estonian] (2022). "Lydia, Phrygia and the Cimmerians: Mesopotamian and Greek evidence combined". In Mattila, Raija [in Finnish]; Fink, Sebastian; Ito, Sanae (eds.). Evidence Combined: Western and Eastern Sources in Dialogue. Melammu Symposia. Vol. 11. Vienna, Austria: Austrian Academy of Sciences Press. pp. 261–294. ISBN 978-3-700-18573-4. Archived from the original on 21 August 2024.
- Khazanov, Anatoly (1975). "Социальная История Скифов: Основные Проблемы Развития Древних Кочевников Евразийских Степей" [The Social History of the Scythians: Main Problems of the Development of the Ancient Nomads of the Eurasian Steppes]. The Social History of the Scythians: Main Problems of the Development of the Ancient Nomads of the Eurasian Steppes (in Russian). Moscow, Soviet Union: Nauka.
- Klaniczay, Gábor (2011). "The Myth of Scythian Origin and the Cult of Attila in the Nineteenth Century". In Klaniczay, Gábor; Werner, Michael [in German]; Gecser, Ottó (eds.). Multiple Antiquities - Multiple Modernities: Ancient Histories in Nineteenth Century European Cultures. Frankfurt, Germany: Campus-Verlag. pp. 183–210. ISBN 978-3-593-39101-4. Archived from the original on 9 June 2023.
- Kramberger, Anja Hellmuth (2014). "Horse, Bow and Arrow - A Comparison between the Scythian Impact on the Mediterranean and on the Eastern Middle Europe". Mediterranean Review. 7 (1): 1–38. Archived from the original on 6 June 2023.
- Krzewińska, Maja (3 October 2018). "Ancient genomes suggest the eastern Pontic-Caspian steppe as the source of western Iron Age nomads". Nature Communications. 4 (10) eaat4457. Bibcode:2018SciA....4.4457K. doi:10.1126/sciadv.aat4457. PMC 6223350. PMID 30417088.
- Kullanda, S. V. [in Russian]; Raevskiy, D. S. [in Russian] (2004). "Эминак в ряду владык Скифии" [Eminakes, King of Scythia] (PDF). Вестник древней истории [Journal of Ancient History] (in Russian). 248 (1): 79–95. Archived (PDF) from the original on 1 May 2023.
- Kullanda, Sergei [in Russian] (2014). "External relations of Scythian". Journal of Language Relationship. 11 (1). Piscataway, United States: Gorgias Press: 81–90. doi:10.31826/jlr-2014-110110. Archived from the original on 19 July 2024.
- Lennon, Joseph (2008). Irish Orientalism: A Literary and Intellectual History. Syracuse, United States: Syracuse University Press. ISBN 978-0-815-63164-4.
- Loades, Mike (2019). War Bows: Longbow, crossbow, composite bow and Japanese yumi. Oxford, United Kingdom: Osprey Publishing. ISBN 978-1-472-82553-7.
- Loehr, Max (1955). "The Stag Image in Scythia and the Far East". Archives of the Chinese Art Society of America. 9. Chinese Art Society of America: 63–76. JSTOR 20066973.
- Lomazoff, Amanda; Ralby, Aaron (2013). "Scythians and Sarmatians". The Atlas of Military History: An Around-the-World Survey of Warfare Through the Ages. San Diego, United States: Thunder Bay Press. ISBN 978-1-60710-985-3.
- Lubotsky, Alexander (2002). "Scythian Elements In Old Iranian" (PDF). Proceedings of the British Academy. 116 (2). Oxford University Press: 189–202.
- MacLeod, Sharon Paice (2013). The Divine Feminine in Ancient Europe: Goddesses, Sacred Women and the Origins of Western Culture. Jefferson, United States: McFarland. ISBN 978-1-476-61392-5.
- Manoledakis, Manolis (2021). Peoples in the Black Sea Region from the Archaic to the Roman Period: Proceedings of the 3rd International Workshop on the Black Sea in Antiquity held in Thessaloniki, 21-23 September 2018. Oxford, United Kingdom: Archaeopress. ISBN 978-1-78969-868-8.
- Maslenikov, Oleg A. (1952). The Frenzied Poets: Andrey Biely and the Russian Symbolists. Berkeley, United States; Los Angeles, United States: University of California Press.
- Mayor, Adrienne (2003). Greek Fire, Poison Arrows, and Scorpion Bombs: Unconventional Warfare in the Ancient World. New York City, United States; London, United Kingdom: Overlook Duckworth. ISBN 978-0-715-63257-4.
- Mayor, Adrienne (2022). Flying Snakes and Griffin Claws: And Other Classical Myths, Historical Oddities, and Scientific Curiosities. Princeton, United States: Princeton University Press. ISBN 978-0-691-21118-3.
- Melikov, Rauf (2016). "Скифские этнонимы и антропонимы в древневосточных клинописных текстах" [Scythian Ethnonyms and Anthroponyms in Ancient Eastern Cuneiform Texts]. Вопросы эпиграфики [Questions of Epigraphy]. 9: 74–96. Archived from the original on 20 August 2024.
- Merrills, A. H. (2005). History and Geography in Late Antiquity. Cambridge, United Kingdom: Cambridge University Press. ISBN 978-1-139-44616-7.
- Melyukova, A. I. (1990). "The Scythians and Sarmatians". In Sinor, Denis (ed.). The Cambridge History of Early Inner Asia. Cambridge, United Kingdom: Cambridge University Press. pp. 97–117. ISBN 978-0-521-24304-9.
- Melyukova, Anna I. (1995). "2. Scythians of Southeastern Europe". In Davis-Kimball, Jeannine; Bashilov, Vladimir A.; Yablonsky, Leonid T. [in Russian] (eds.). Nomads of the Eurasian Steppes in the Early Iron Age. Berkeley, United States: Zinat Press. pp. 27–61. ISBN 978-1-885979-00-1.
- Minns, Ellis Hovell (1913). Scythians and Greeks: A Survey of Ancient History and Archaeology on the North Coast of the Euxine from the Danube to the Caucasus. Cambridge, United Kingdom: Cambridge University Press.
- Oates, J. (1991). "The Fall of Assyria (635-609 B.C.)". In Boardman, John; Edwards, I. E. S.; Hammond, N. G. L.; Sollberger, E.; Walker, C. B. F. (eds.). The Assyrian and Babylonian Empires and other States of the Near East, from the Eighth to the Sixth Centuries B.C. The Cambridge Ancient History. Vol. 3. Cambridge, United Kingdom: Cambridge University Press. pp. 162–193. ISBN 978-1-139-05429-4.
- Olbrycht, Marek Jan [in Polish] (2000a). "The Cimmerian Problem Re-Examined: the Evidence of the Classical Sources". In Pstrusińska, Jadwiga [in Polish]; Fear, Andrew (eds.). Collectanea Celto-Asiatica Cracoviensia. Kraków: Księgarnia Akademicka. pp. 71–100. ISBN 978-8-371-88337-8. Archived from the original on 13 August 2022.
- Olbrycht, Marek Jan [in Polish] (2000b). "Remarks on the Presence of Iranian Peoples in Europe and Their Asiatic Relations". In Pstrusińska, Jadwiga [in Polish]; Fear, Andrew (eds.). Collectanea Celto-Asiatica Cracoviensia. Kraków: Księgarnia Akademicka. pp. 101–140. ISBN 978-8-371-88337-8. Archived from the original on 25 September 2022.
- Olkhovsky, Valery S. (1995). "3. Scythian Culture in the Crimea". In Davis-Kimball, Jeannine; Bashilov, Vladimir A.; Yablonsky, Leonid T. [in Russian] (eds.). Nomads of the Eurasian Steppes in the Early Iron Age. Berkeley, United States: Zinat Press. pp. 63–81. ISBN 978-1-885979-00-1.
- Parpola, Simo (1970). Neo-Assyrian Toponyms. Kevelaer, Germany: Butzon & Bercker.
- Parzinger, Hermann (2004). Die Skythen [The Scythians] (in German). Munich, Germany: Verlag C.H.Beck. ISBN 978-3-406-50842-4.
- Petrenko, Vladimir G. (1995). "1. Scythian Culture in the North Caucasus". In Davis-Kimball, Jeannine; Bashilov, Vladimir A.; Yablonsky, Leonid T. [in Russian] (eds.). Nomads of the Eurasian Steppes in the Early Iron Age. Berkeley, United States: Zinat Press. pp. 5–25. ISBN 978-1-885979-00-1.
- Phillips, E. D. (1972). "The Scythian Domination in Western Asia: Its Record in History, Scripture and Archaeology". World Archaeology. 4 (2): 129–138. doi:10.1080/00438243.1972.9979527. JSTOR 123971.
- Potts, Daniel T. (1999). The Archaeology of Elam: Formation and Transformation of an Ancient Iranian State. Cambridge University Press. ISBN 0-521-56496-4.
- Rolle, Renate [in German] (1989). The World of the Scythians. Berkeley, United States: University of California Press. ISBN 978-0-520-06864-3.
- Schmitt, Rüdiger (2000). "Protothyes". Encyclopædia Iranica. New York City, United States: Encyclopædia Iranica Foundation; Brill Publishers. Archived from the original on 27 April 2024.
- Schmitt, Rüdiger (2003a). "Haumavargā". Encyclopædia Iranica. New York City, United States: Encyclopædia Iranica Foundation; Brill Publishers. Archived from the original on 1 December 2017.
- Schmitt, Rüdiger (2003b). "Die skythischen Personennamen bei Herodot" [Scythian Personal Names in Herodotus] (PDF). Annali dell'Università degli Studi di Napoli l'Orientale [Journal of the University of Naples "L'Orientale"] (in German). 63. University of Naples "L'Orientale": 1–31. Archived (PDF) from the original on 7 June 2023.
- Schmitt, Rüdiger (2009). Iranisches Personennamenbuch [Book of Iranian Personal Names]. Iranische Onomastik (in German). Vol. 7.1a. Verlag der Österreichischen Akademie der Wissenschaften. ISBN 978-3-700-16608-5.
- Schmitt, Rüdiger (2011). Iranisches Personennamenbuch [Book of Iranian Personal Names]. Iranische Onomastik (in German). Vol. 5.5a. Verlag der Österreichischen Akademie der Wissenschaften. pp. 341–342. ISBN 978-3-700-17142-3.
- Schmitt, Rüdiger (2018). "Scythian language". Encyclopædia Iranica. New York City, United States: Encyclopædia Iranica Foundation; Brill Publishers. Archived from the original on 20 September 2022.
- Schwartz, Martin; Manaster Ramer, Alexis (2019). "Some Interlinguistic Iranian Conundrums". In Hintze, Almut; Durkin, Desmond; Naumann, Claudius (eds.). A Thousand Judgements: Festschrift for Maria Macuch. Wiesbaden, Germany: Harrassowitz Verlag. pp. 357–362. ISBN 978-3-447-11094-5. Archived from the original on 24 September 2024.
- Spalinger, Anthony J. [in German] (1978a). "The Date of the Death of Gyges and Its Historical Implications". Journal of the American Oriental Society. 98 (4): 400–409. doi:10.2307/599752. JSTOR 599752.
- Spalinger, Anthony [in German] (1978b). "Psammetichus, King of Egypt: II". Journal of the American Research Center in Egypt. 15: 49–57. doi:10.2307/40000130. JSTOR 40000130.
- Sulimirski, T. (1954). "Scythian Antiquities in Western Asia". Artibus Asiae. 17 (3). Ascona, Switzerland: Artibus Asiae Publishers: 282–318. doi:10.2307/3249059. JSTOR 3249059.
- Sulimirski, T. (1985). "The Scyths". In Gershevitch, I. (ed.). The Median and Achaemenian Periods. The Cambridge History of Iran. Vol. 2. Cambridge, United Kingdom: Cambridge University Press. pp. 149–199. ISBN 978-1-139-05493-5.
- Sulimirski, Tadeusz; Taylor, T. F. (1991). "The Scythians". In Boardman, John; Edwards, I. E. S.; Hammond, N. G. L.; Sollberger, E.; Walker, C. B. F. (eds.). The Assyrian and Babylonian Empires and other States of the Near East, from the Eighth to the Sixth Centuries B.C. The Cambridge Ancient History. Vol. 3. Cambridge, United Kingdom: Cambridge University Press. pp. 547–590. ISBN 978-1-139-05429-4.
- Szemerényi, Oswald (1980). Four old Iranian ethnic names: Scythian – Skudra – Sogdian – Saka (PDF). Verlag der Österreichischen Akademie der Wissenschaften. ISBN 0-520-06864-5.
- Testen, David (1997). "Ossetic Phonology". In Kaye, Alan S. (ed.). Phonologies of Asia and Africa: (including the Caucasus). Vol. 2. Eisenbrauns. pp. 707–733. ISBN 1-57506-019-1.
- Tokhtas'ev, Sergei R. [in Russian] (1991). "Cimmerians". Encyclopædia Iranica. New York City, United States: Encyclopædia Iranica Foundation; Brill Publishers. Archived from the original on 29 April 2011.
- Tokhtasyev, Sergey [in Russian] (2005a). "Проблема Скифского Языка в Современной Науке" [The Problem of the Scythian Language in Contemporary Studies]. In Cojocaru, Victor (ed.). Ethnic Contacts and Cultural Exchanges North and West of the Black Sea from the Greek Colonization to the Ottoman Conquest: Proceedings of the International Symposium Ethnic contacts and Cultural Exchanges North and West of the Black Sea, Iaşi, June 12-17, 2005. Iași, Romania: Trinitas Publishing House; Iași Institute of Archaeology. pp. 59–108. ISBN 978-9-737-83450-8. Archived from the original on 24 September 2024.
- Tokhtasyev, Sergey [in Russian] (2005b). "Sauromatae - Syrmatae - Sarmatae". Херсонесский сборник [Chersonesian Collection] (in Russian). 14: 291–306. Archived from the original on 4 September 2023.
- Tsetskhladze, Gocha R. (17 December 2002) [1998]. "Who Built the Scythian and Thracian Royal and Elite Tombs?". Oxford Journal of Archaeology. 17 (1). Wiley: 55–92. doi:10.1111/1468-0092.00051.
- Unterländer, Martina (2017). "Ancestry and demography and descendants of Iron Age nomads of the Eurasian Steppe". Nature Communications. 8 14615. Bibcode:2017NatCo...814615U. doi:10.1038/ncomms14615. PMC 5337992. PMID 28256537.
- Ustinova, Yulia (1999). The Supreme Gods of the Bosporan Kingdom: Celestial Aphrodite and the Most High God. Leiden, Netherlands; Boston, United States: BRILL. ISBN 978-9-004-11231-5.
- Vaggione, Richard P. (1973). "Over All Asia? The Extent of the Scythian Domination in Herodotus". Journal of Biblical Literature. 92 (4): 523–530. doi:10.2307/3263121. JSTOR 3263121.
- West, Stephanie (2002). "Scythians". In Bakker, Egbert J.; de Jong, Irene J. F.; van Wees, Hans (eds.). Brill's Companion to Herodotus. Leiden, Netherlands: Brill. pp. 437–456. ISBN 978-90-04-21758-4.
- Williams, Mark (2016). Ireland's Immortals: A History of the Gods of Irish Myth. Princeton, United States; Oxford, United Kingdom: Princeton University Press. ISBN 978-1-400-88332-5.
- Witton, Mark P.; Hing, Richard A. (2024). "Did the horned dinosaur Protoceratops inspire the griffin?". Interdisciplinary Science Reviews. 49 (10.1177/03080188241255543): 363–388. Bibcode:2024ISRv...49..363W. doi:10.1177/03080188241255543.
- Yablonsky, Leonid T. [in Russian] (2006). "Reconstructing Cimmerian and Early Scythian History: The Written Sources". In Aruz, Joan; Farkas, Ann; Fino, Elisabetta Valtz (eds.). The Golden Deer of Eurasia: Perspectives on the Steppe Nomads of the Ancient World. New Haven, Connecticut, United States; New York City, United States; London, United Kingdom: The Metropolitan Museum of Art; Yale University Press. pp. 24–31. ISBN 978-1-588-39205-3.
- Young, T. Cuyler (1988a). "The early history of the Medes and the Persians and the Achaemenid empire to the death of Cambyses". In Boardman, John; Hammond, N. G. L.; Lewis, D. M.; Ostwald, M. (eds.). Persia, Greece and the Western Mediterranean, c. 525 to 479 B.C. The Cambridge Ancient History. Vol. 4. Cambridge, United Kingdom: Cambridge University Press. pp. 1–52. ISBN 978-0-521-22804-6.
- Young, T. Cuyler (1988b). "The Consolidation of the Empire and its Limits of Growth under Darius and Xerxes". In Boardman, John; Hammond, N. G. L.; Lewis, D. M.; Ostwald, M. (eds.). Persia, Greece and the Western Mediterranean, c. 525 to 479 B.C. The Cambridge Ancient History. Vol. 4. Cambridge, United Kingdom: Cambridge University Press. pp. 53–111. ISBN 978-0-521-22804-6.
- Zaikov, A. V. (2004). "Alcman and the Image of Scythian Steed". In Tuplin, Christopher (ed.). Pontus and the Outside World: Studies in Black Sea History, Historiography, and Archaeology. Colloquia Pontica. Leiden, Netherlands: Brill Publishers. pp. 69–84. ISBN 978-9-004-12154-6. Archived from the original on 19 June 2023.
