= Siege of Uspe =

49 sack

- Part of Roman-Bosporan War
Date	c. 49 AD
Location	Cimmerian Bosporus
Result	Aorsic Victory: Complete destruction of Uspe

Belligerents
Aorsi	Siraces

Commanders and leaders
Eunones	Zorsines

Strength
Unknown	10,000+

Casualties and losses
Unknown	10,000 captured

The siege of Uspe was a short siege during the brief Roman-Bosporan War between the Siraceni and the Aorsi on the weakly fortified stronghold of Uspe.

== Background and Siege ==
Zorsines had been aiding Mithridates III in his war against his brother Cotys I since 40 AD. The Mithridatic faction had been losing, having lost Artezian to the Roman forces sometime in 45 AD.

The siege began after Aorsi commander Eunones crossed the river Panda and noticed that the stronghold had weak defenses that he could use in his favor. Eunones constructed towers to harass the people of the city with darts and arrows to soften their defenses and force them to expedite their surrender. After not being able to take no more, the people of Uspe offered a capitulation of 10,000 hostages, to which the Aorsi declined. The siege in total would have begun and finished within one day if nightfall had not stopped the conflict. Not being able to hold out against the Aorsi for too long, Zorsines sued for peace and acknowledge the superiority of Claudius.

After Mithridates learned of his ally's defeat, he also sued for peace as he found his troop numbers not sufficient to continue the war.
