= Roman–Bosporan War =

1st century AD war of succession in Cimmerian Bosporus

- Map of the growth of the Bosporan Kingdom
Date	c. 45–49
Location	Cimmerian Bosporus
Result	Strategic Bosporan/Roman Victory; Complete destruction of Uspe; Mithridates is exiled from the Bosporus; Peace between Aorsi and Siraces

Belligerents
Roman Empire; Bosporan Kingdom; Aorsi	Siraces; Dandaridae

Commanders and leaders
Cotys I Eunones of Aorsi; Gaius Julius Aquila	Mithridates III; Zorsines of Siraces

Strength
3–4 cohorts (around 1440 men); Eunones's army	10,000+

Casualties and losses
Unknown	Unknown

The Roman–Bosporan War was a lengthy war of succession that took place in the Cimmerian Bosporus, probably from 45 to 49. It was fought between the Roman client-king Tiberius Julius Cotys I and his allies King Eunones of the Aorsi and the Roman commander Gaius Julius Aquila against the former king Tiberius Julius Mithridates and his ally King Zorsines of the Siraces.

== Sources and dating ==
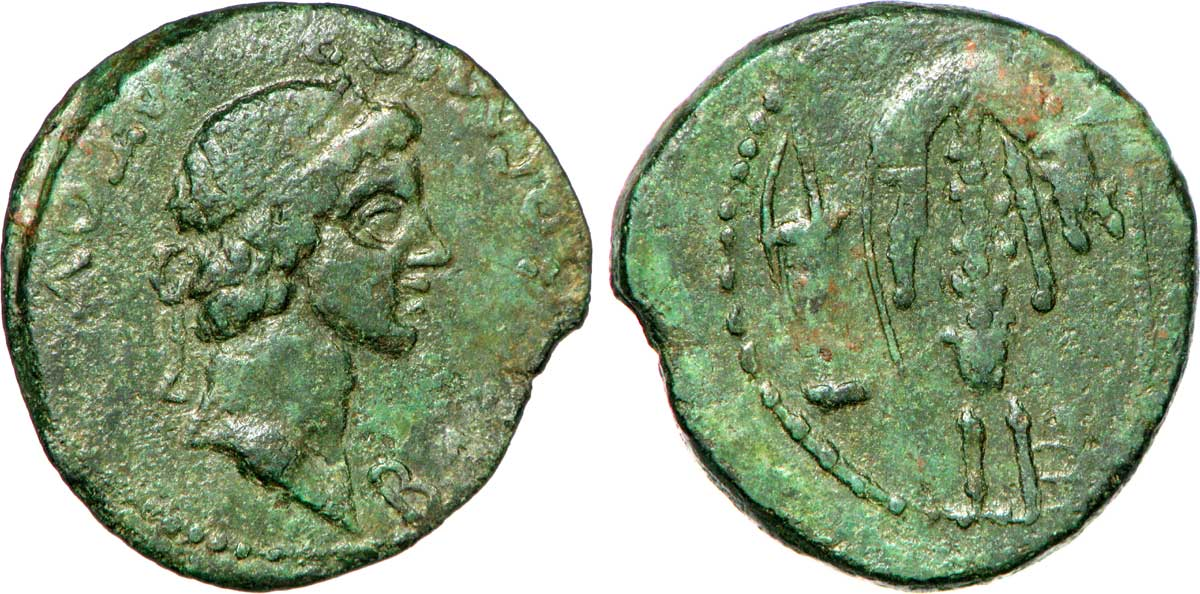
Coin of Tiberius Julius Mithridates

Sources that mention the conflict include Tacitus's Annals (Book 12, chapter 7), Cassius Dio's Roman History (Book 59, chapter 12), and Peter the Patrician's History. Coins found from the period are important in helping to date the events. The commonly provided dates for the war are 45 to 49, because the oldest coin found featuring the monogram of Cotys has the date 342 Bosporan era (AB), which corresponds to 45 Common Era (CE), and Tacitus relates that Mithridates arrived in Rome in 49 CE after having been driven from the Bosporus.

== Prelude ==
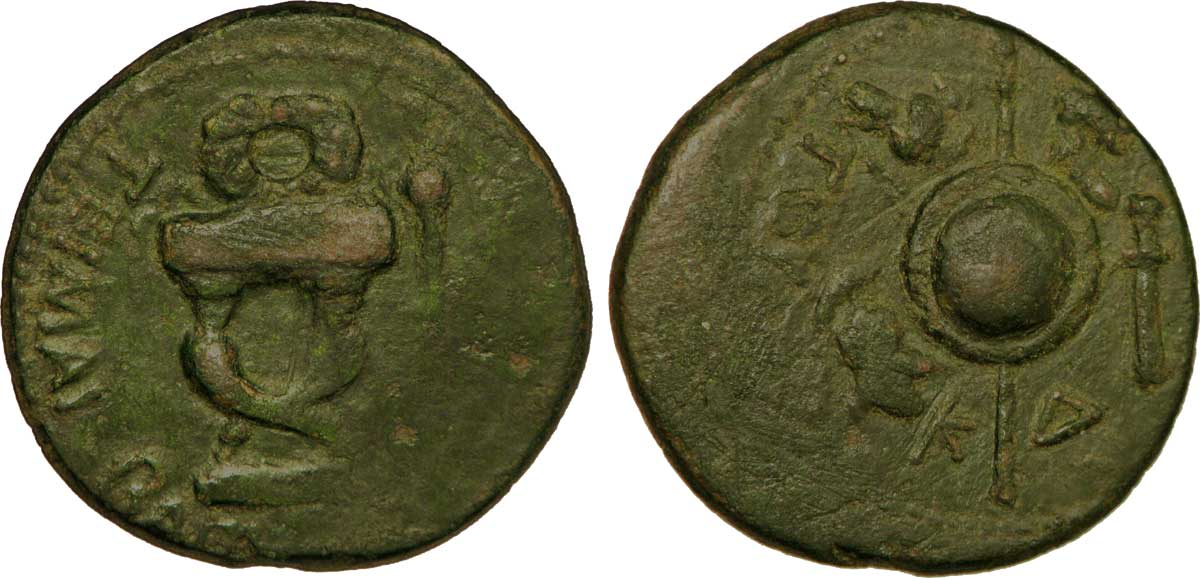
Tetranummia coined by Tiberius Julius Cotys I

Mithridates III and Cotys I were sons of Aspurgus and Gepaepyris who were rulers of the Bosporan Kingdom. After the death of his father in 38, Mithridates III became joint-ruler with his mother Gepaepyris, and sometime between 38 and 45, Roman Emperor Claudius made him ruler of all of the Bosporan Kingdom. In 45, for reasons unknown, Claudius deposed Mithridates and made his younger brother, Cotys I, ruler of the Bosporan Kingdom. At the same time, Claudius withdrew the Roman garrison under Aulus Didius Gallus leaving only a few cohorts under Gaius Julius Aquila.

In response, Mithridates III allied himself with the neighbouring tribes, most notably with the Siraces under Zorsines and he was able to raise an army and push out the king of the Dandaridae and establish himself in that king's dominions. He then declared war against his brother and the Roman cohorts under Aquila.

When Cotys heard of this, he turned to Gaius Julius Aquila and his Roman cohorts to help him fight off his elder brother. Cotys and Aquila feared that Mithridates's army was larger, and enlisted the help of Eunones, who was at the time ruler of the Aorsi. Eunones quickly sided with the Pro-Roman faction, as Aquila pointed out the strength of Rome to that of Mithridates.

== Conflict and defeat ==
The Romans began to lay siege to towns under the dominion of Mithridates such as Artezian, a fortress in Crimea while the Aorsi under Eunones laid siege to the fortified settlement of Uspe under Zorsines.

After crossing the river Panda, Eunones lay siege to Uspe, which was a weakly-protected fortified city of the Siraces. The settlement had weak defences and was not able to withstand an attack. The Aorsi constructed towers to "annoy" the people of Uspe with darts and arrows. Throughout the siege, the town offered them 10,000 slaves, an offer which the Romans travelling with the Aorsi declined, as they were too rebellious to keep in check. Within a day Zorsines made peace with his enemies to end the siege of Uspe.

Meanwhile, Aquila and his cohorts were attacking the towns of Mithridates. Upon hearing that Zorsines had made peace with his enemies, Mithridates realised that he was losing and considered to whom he should seek mercy. He turned to Eunones, the only one of his enemies that was not in the conflict for personal benefit. Mithridates went to Eunones's palace and threw himself at the ruler's feet and said "Mithridates, whom the Romans have sought so many years by land and sea, stands before you by his own choice. Deal as you please with the descendant of the great Achaemenes, the only glory of which enemies have not robbed me." This act of greatly affected Eunones, and he raised the former ruler and was pleased that Mithridates had chosen the Aorsi to help him sue for mercy with Rome.

== Aftermath ==
After sending envoys to Claudius, Mithridates pleaded mercy in front of the Roman Emperor himself. Claudius deemed Mithridates's actions deserving of extreme penalties. However, Mithridates said that "I have not been sent, but have come back to you; if you do not believe me, let me go and pursue me" Claudius was impressed by the good-will of Mithridates, and let him live.

== See also ==
- Aorsi
- Roman Crimea
- Bosporan Kingdom
- Claudius

== Sources ==
- Tacitus, Annals (Book 12, chapter 7)
- Cassius Dio, Roman History (Book 59, chapter 12)
- Peter the Patrician, History
