= Yancai =

Nomadic people of ancient Central Asia

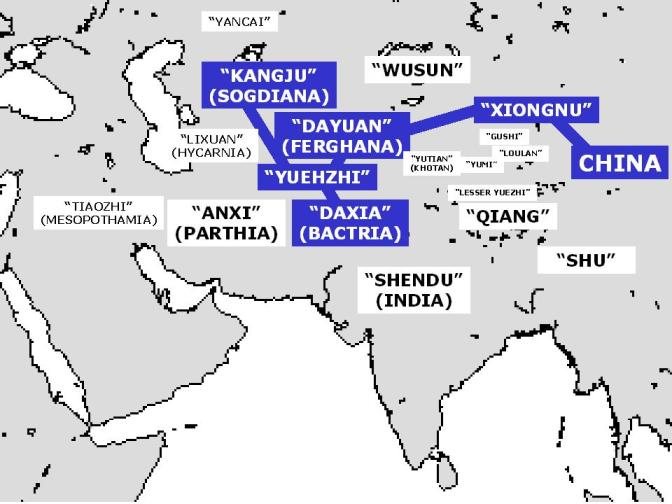
Countries described in Zhang Qian's report. Visited countries are highlighted in blue.

Yancai (Chinese: 奄蔡; pinyin: Yǎncài; Wade–Giles: Yen-ts’ai; lit. 'Vast Steppe' < LHC *ʔɨam^{A}-sɑ^{C} < OC (125 BCE) *ʔɨam-sɑs, a.k.a. 闔蘇 Hésū < *ĥa̱p-sa̱ĥ; compare also Latin Abzoae) was the Chinese name of an ancient Iranic nomadic state of the Sarmatians, centered near the Aral Sea during the Han dynasty period (206 BC—220 AD). After becoming vassals of the Kangju in the 1st century BC, Yancai became known as Alan (Chinese: 阿蘭; pinyin: Ālán; Wade–Giles: A-lan). Yancai 奄蔡 is often connected to the Aorsi of Roman records, while 阿蘭 Alan has been connected to the later Alans. (Note: According to Chavannes (1907), Weilüe correctly states that Yancai's alternative name is simply 阿蘭 Ālán instead of 阿蘭聊 Ālánliáo as recorded in Book of Later Han; as 聊 Liáo looks similar to 柳 Liǔ, the name of a separate country already mentioned before 岩 Yán & 阿蘭 Ālán.)

== History ==
Yancai is first mentioned in Chapter 123 of the Shiji (whose author, Sima Qian, died c. 90 BC), based on the travels of 2nd century BC Chinese diplomat Zhang Qian:

Yancai lies some 2,000 li [832 km] northwest of Kangju. The people are nomads and their customs are generally similar to those of the people of Kangju. The country has over 100,000 archer warriors, and borders on a great shoreless lake.

The people of Yancai are usually considered an Iranian people of the Sarmatian group. They are often connected to the Aorsi of Roman records, who dominated the area between the Don and the Aral Sea and were both a wealthy mercantile people and a powerful military force. According to Chinese sources, Yancai belonged to the northern part of the Silk Route, known as the Northern Route. The Chinese sent embassies to Yancai and actively promoted trading relations.

The Later Han dynasty Chinese chronicle, the Hou Hanshu, 88 (covering the period 25–220 and completed in the 5th century), mentioned a report that Yancai was now as vassal state of the Kangju known as Alanliao:

The kingdom of Yancai [lit. ‘Vast Steppe’] has changed its name to the kingdoms of Alan [and] Liao. They occupy the country and the towns. They are dependencies of Kangju [the Talas basin, Tashkent and Sogdiana]. The climate is mild. Wax trees, pines, and ‘white grass’ [aconite] are plentiful. Their way of life and dress are similar to those of Kangju.

Y. A. Zadneprovskiy writes that the subjection of Yancai by the Kangju occurred in the 1st century BC. The westward expansion of the Kangju obliged many of the Sarmatians to migrate westwards, and this contributed significantly to the Migration Period in Europe, which played a major role in world history. The name Alanliao has been connected by modern scholars with that of the Alans.

Yancai is last mentioned in the 3rd century Weilüe:

Then there is the kingdom of Liu, the kingdom of Yan [to the north of Yancai], and the kingdom of Yancai [between the Black and Caspian Seas], which is also called Alan. They all have the same way of life as those of Kangju. To the west, they border Da Qin [Roman territory], to the southeast they border Kangju [the Chu, Talas, and middle Jaxartes basins]. These kingdoms have large numbers of their famous sables. They raise cattle and move about in search of water and fodder. They are close to a large shoreless lake. Previously they were vassals of Kangju [the Chu, Talas, and middle Jaxartes basins]. Now they are no longer vassals.

In the 1st and 2nd centuries AD, the Alans emerged as the dominant people of the Sarmatians either through conquering or absorbing other tribes. At this time they migrated westwards to Southern Russia and frequently raided the Parthian and Roman Empire.

== See also ==
- Yuezhi
- Wusun
- Xiongnu
- Dayuan
- List of ancient Iranian peoples
