= Sarmatians =

Large Iranian confederation that existed in classical antiquity

- People
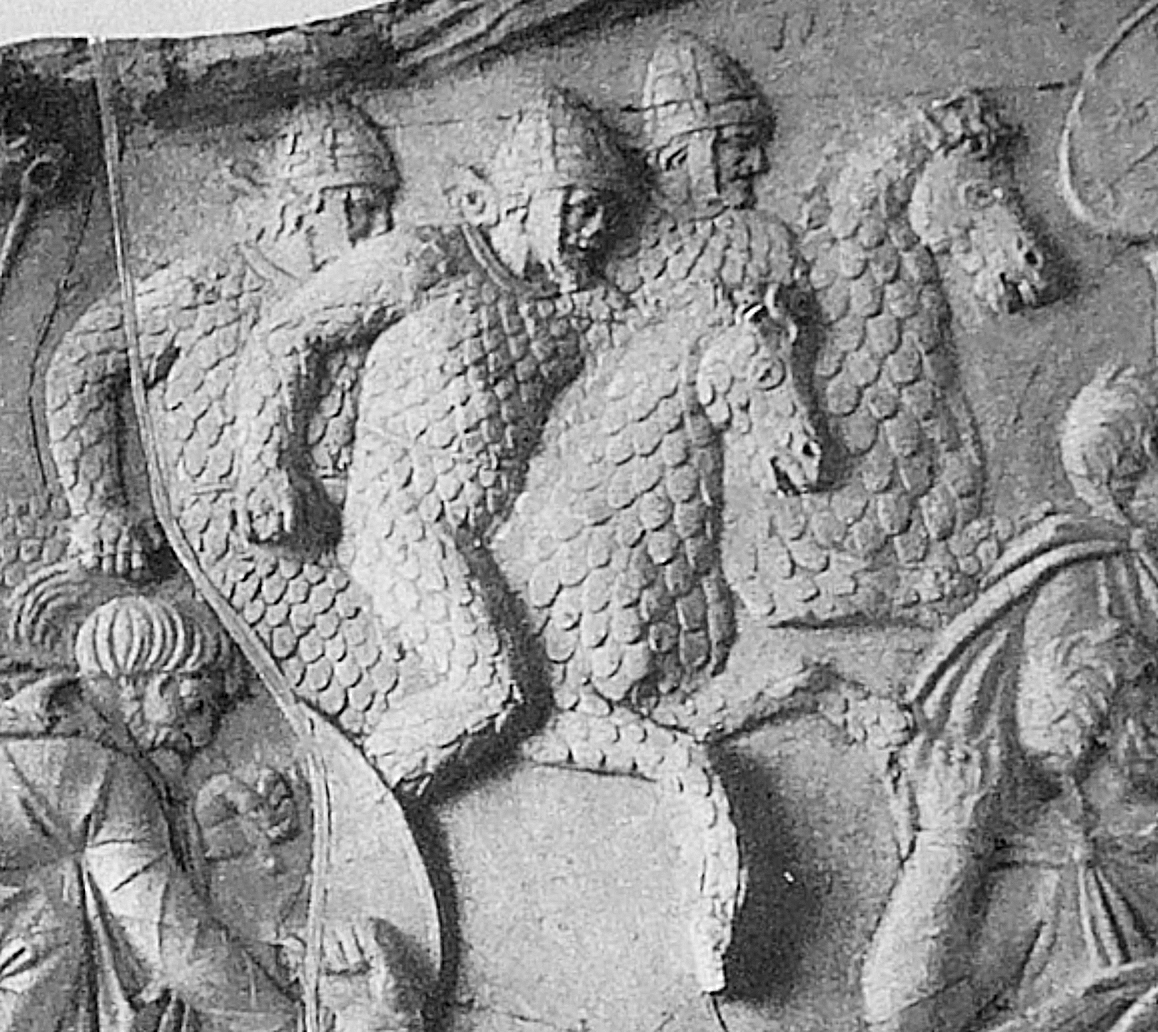
- Sarmatian cataphracts depicted on Trajan's Column, 2nd century CE.
- Ethnicity: Iranian
- Location: Southern Ural, Caucasus, Black Sea
- Language: Scytho-Sarmatian languages

The Sarmatians (/sɑːrˈmeɪʃiənz/; Ancient Greek: Σαρμάται, romanized: Sarmátai; Latin: Sarmatae [ˈsarmatae̯]) were a large confederation of ancient Iranian equestrian nomadic peoples who dominated the Pontic steppe from around the 5th century BCE to the 4th century CE.

The earliest known reference to the Sarmatians comes from the Avesta, where they are mentioned as Sairima-, which in later Iranian sources became Sarm and Salm. Originating in the central parts of the Eurasian Steppe, the Sarmatians formed part of the wider Scythian cultures. They started migrating westward around the 4th and 3rd centuries BCE, coming to dominate the closely related Scythians by 200 BCE. At their greatest reported extent, around 100 BCE, these tribes could be found from the Danube and eastward to the Volga, bordering the shores of the Black and Caspian seas and the Caucasus to the south.

In the 1st century CE, the Sarmatians began encroaching upon the Roman Empire in alliance with Germanic tribes. In the 3rd century CE, the Germanic Goths broke the Sarmatian dominance of the Pontic Steppe. With the Hunnic invasions of the 4th century, many Sarmatians joined the Goths and other Germanic tribes, such as the Vandals, and settled in the Western Roman Empire. Since large parts of today's Russia, specifically the land between the Ural Mountains and the Don River, were controlled in the 5th century BCE by the Sarmatians, the Lower Volga–Don steppes are sometimes called the "Sarmatian Motherland".

The Sarmatians in the Bosporan Kingdom assimilated into Greek civilization, while others were absorbed by the proto-Circassian Maeotian people, the Alans, and the Goths. Other Sarmatians were assimilated and absorbed by the Early Slavs. The Alans survived in the North Caucasus into the Early Middle Ages, ultimately giving rise to the modern Ossetic ethnic group.

The early-modern Polish nobility (Polish: szlachta) claimed descent from the Sarmatians.

== Etymology ==
Map of the Roman Empire under Hadrian (ruled 117–138 CE), showing the location of the Sarmatae in the Pontic steppe region

The Greek name Sarmatai (Σαρμάται) is derived from the Old Iranic Sarmatian endonym *Sarmata or *Sarumata, of which another variant, *Saᵘrumata, gave rise to the ancient Greek name Sauromatai (Σαυρομάται). The form *Sarmata or *Sarumata was the main form of the name, and initially coexisted with the form *Saᵘrumata until the late 4th to early 3rd centuries BCE, when *Sarmata/*Sarumata became the only variant of the name in use.

This name meant "armed with throwing darts and arrows" and is cognate with the Indic Sanskrit term śárumant, which makes it semantically similar to the endonym of the Scythians, *Skuδa, meaning "archers."

The later, Middle Iranic, form of *Saᵘrumata was *Sōrmata or *Sōrumata, of which the later form, *Sūrmata or *Sūrumata, was recorded in ancient Greek as Syrmatai (Συρμάται; Latin: Syrmatae).

== Location ==
The territory inhabited by the Sarmatians, which was known as Sarmatia (/sɑːrˈmeɪʃiə/) to Greco-Roman ethnographers, covered the western part of greater Scythia, and corresponded to today's Central Ukraine, South-Eastern Ukraine, Southern Russia, Russian Volga, and South-Ural regions, and to a smaller extent the northeastern Balkans and around Moldova.

== History ==
=== Origin ===
Reconstruction of a Sarmatian man

The Sarmatians were an Iranian-speaking people who arrived in (or originated in) the Ural region between the 6th and 4th centuries BCE.

The origin of the Sarmatians is unclear and subject to scholarly debate. Recent scholars have suggested that the Sarmatians were directly descended from the Scythians, and many scholars have accepted the view that the Sarmatians were an autochonthus population. However, the majority of scholars still accept the view that Sarmatians arrived in the Urals from central Asia.

Genetic studies suggest that the Sarmatians showed a strong affinity with the Sintashta and Andronovo cultures, while also exhibiting a low level of East Asian ancestry, likely mediated through admixture with the Sakas of the Altai region, the earliest Scythian cultural group. A 2025 genetic study suggested that the Sarmatians most likely originated from independent groups of Western Steppe Herders based in the southern Urals, showing strong links, in terms of paternal DNA, to the Sintashta and Srubnaya cultures.

The name "Sarmatians" eventually came to be applied to the whole of the new people formed out of these migrations, whose constituent tribes were the Aorsi, Roxolani, Alans, and the Iazyges. Despite the similarity between the names Sarmatian and Sauromatian, modern authors distinguish between the two. A typical transitional site between these two periods is found in the Filippovka kurgans, which are Late Sauromatian-Early Sarmatian, and dated to the 5th-4th century BCE.

=== In the Pontic Steppe and Europe ===
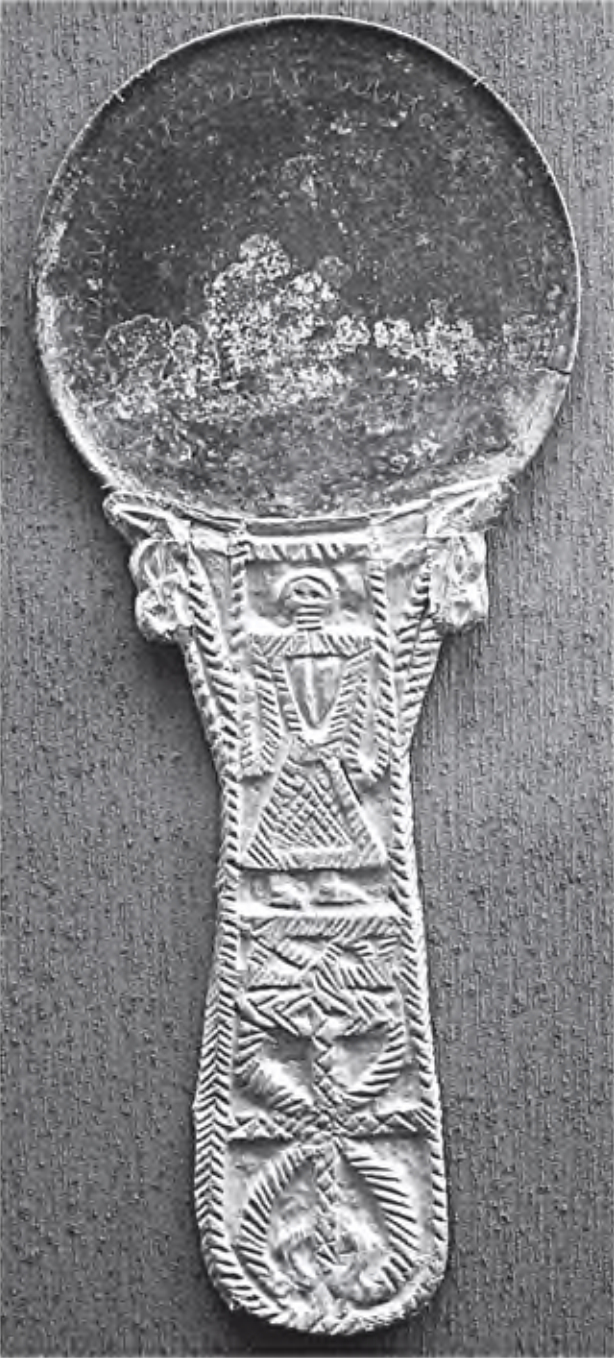
Gold mirror, Mayerovsky III Kurgan 4 (Nikolaevsky District, Volgograd region), 2nd-1st centuries BCE.

During the 4th and 3rd centuries BCE, the centre of Sarmatian power remained north of the Caucasus and in the 3rd century BCE the most important centres were around the lower Don, Kalmykia, the Kuban area, and the Central Caucasus.

During the end of the 4th century BCE, the Scythians, the then dominant power in the Black Sea Steppe, were militarily defeated by the Macedonian kings Philip II of Macedon and Lysimachus in 339 and 313 BCE respectively. They experienced another military setback after participating in the Bosporan Civil War in 309 BCE and came under pressure from the Thracian Getae and the Celtic Bastarnae. At the same time, in Central Asia, following the Macedonian conquest of the Achaemenid Empire, the new Seleucid Empire started attacking the Sakā and Dahā nomads who lived to the north of its borders, who in turn put westward pressure on the Sarmatians. Pressured by the Sakā and Dahā in the east, and taking advantage of the decline of Scythian power, the Sarmatians began crossing the Don river and invaded Scythia; they also migrated south into the North Caucasus.

The first wave of westward Sarmatian migration happened during the 2nd century BCE, and involved the Royal Sarmatians, or Saioi (from Scytho-Sarmatian *xšaya, meaning "kings"), who moved into the Pontic Steppe, and the Iazyges, also called the Iaxamatai or Iazamatai, who initially settled between the Don and Dnieper rivers. The Roxolani, who might have been a mixed Scytho-Sarmatian tribe, followed the Iazyges and occupied the Black Sea steppes up to the Dnipro and raided the Crimean region during that century, at the end of which they were involved in a conflict with the generals of the Pontic king Mithridates VI Eupator in the Bosporan Chersonesus, while the Iazyges became his allies.

That the tribes formerly referred to by Herodotus as Scythians were now called Sarmatians by Hellenistic and Roman authors implies that the Sarmatian conquest did not involve a displacement of the Scythians from the Pontic Steppe, but rather that the Scythian tribes were absorbed by the Sarmatians. After their conquest of Scythia, the Sarmatians became the dominant political power in the northern Pontic Steppe, where Sarmatian graves first started appearing in the 2nd century BCE. Meanwhile, the populations which still identified as Scythians proper became reduced to Crimea and the Dobruja region, and at one point the Crimean Scythians were the vassals of the Sarmatian queen Amage. Sarmatian power in the Pontic Steppes was also directed against the Greek cities on its shores, with the city of Pontic Olbia being forced to pay repeated tribute to the Royal Sarmatians and their king Saitapharnes, who is mentioned in the Protogenes inscription along with the tribes of the Thisamatae, Scythians, and Saudaratae. Another Sarmatian king, Gatalos, was named in a peace treaty concluded by the king Pharnaces I of Pontus with his enemies.

Two other Sarmatian tribes, the Siraces, who had previously originated in the Transcaspian Plains immediately to the northeast of Hyrcania before migrating to the west, and the Aorsi, moved to the west across the Volga and into the Caucasus mountains' foothills between the 2nd to 1st centuries BCE. From there, the pressure from their growing power forcing the more western Sarmatian tribes to migrate further west, and the Aorsi and Siraces destroyed the power of the Royal Sarmatians and the Iazyges, with the Aorsi being able to extend their rule over a large region stretching from the Caucasus across the Terek–Kuma Lowland and Kalmykia in the west up to the Aral Sea region in the east. Yet another new Sarmatian group, the Alans, originated in Central Asia out of the merger of some old tribal groups with the Massagetae. Related to the Asii who invaded Bactria in the 2nd century BCE, the Alans were pushed west by the Kangju people (known to Graeco-Roman authors as the Ιαξαρται Iaxartai in Greek, and the Iaxartae in Latin) who were living in the Syr Darya basin, from where they expanded their rule from Fergana to the Aral Sea region.

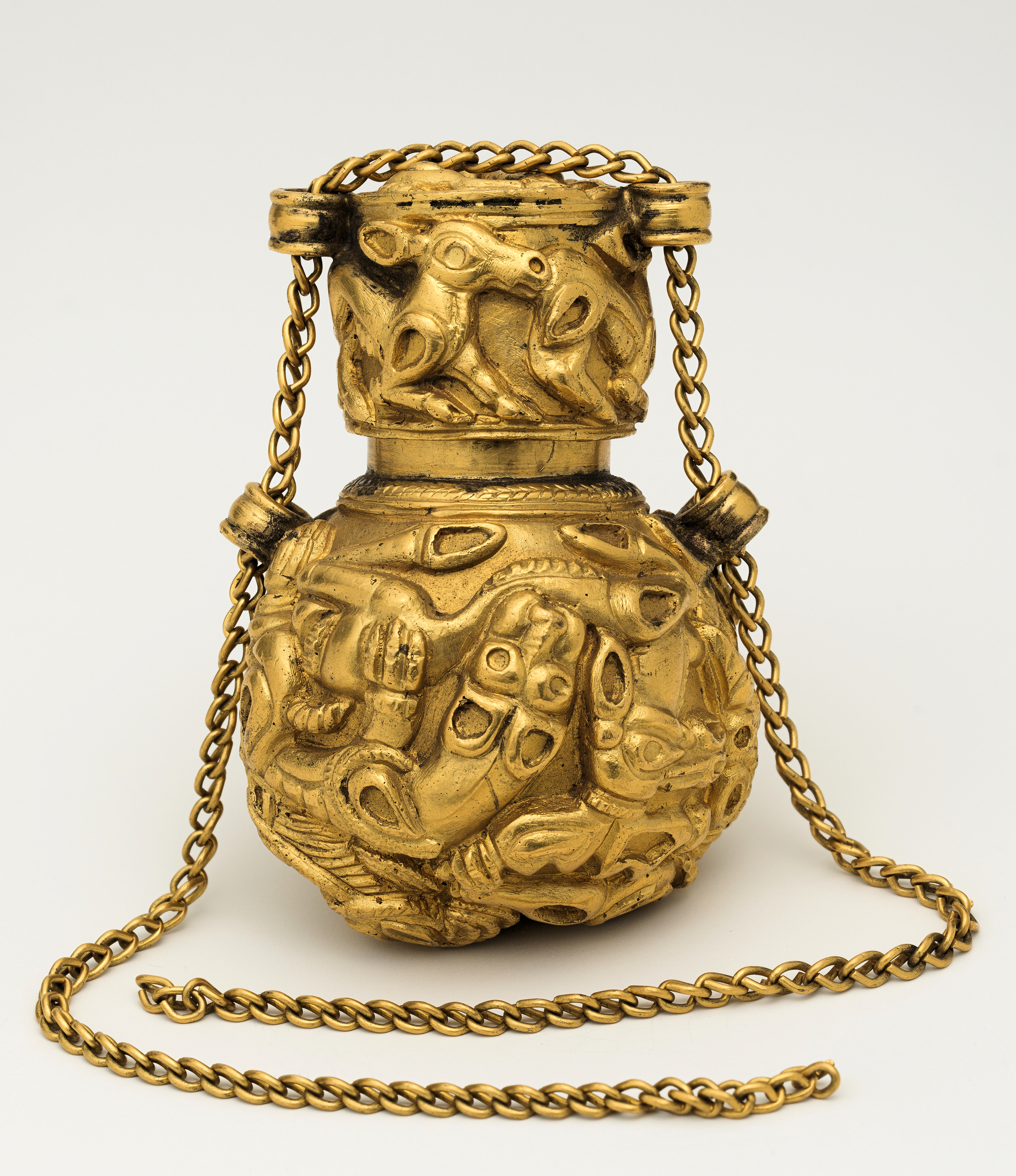
Sarmatian bottle and lid (1st century CE, reproduction)

The hegemony of the Sarmatians in the Pontic Steppe continued during the 1st century BCE, when they were allied with the Scythians against Diophantus, a general of Mithradates VI Eupator, before allying with Mithradates against the Romans and fighting for him in both Europe and Asia, demonstrating the Sarmatians' complete involvement in the affairs of the Pontic and Danubian regions. During the early part of the century, the Alans had migrated to the area to the northeast of the Lake Maeotis. Meanwhile, the Iazyges moved westwards until they reached the Danube, and the Roxolani moved into the area between the Dnipro and the Danube and from there further west. These two peoples attacked the regions around Tomis and Moesia, respectively. During this period, the Iazyges and Roxolani also attacked the Roman province of Thracia, whose governor Tiberius Plautius Silvanus Aelianus had to defend the Roman border of the Danube. During the 1st century BCE, various Sarmatians reached the Pannonian Basin, with the Iazyges passing through the territories corresponding to modern-day Moldavia and Wallachia before settling in the Tisza valley, by the middle of the century.

Although the Sarmatian were defeated and their movements stopped temporarily during the 1st century BCE due to the rise of the Dacian kingdom of Burebista, they resumed after the collapse of his kingdom following his assassination and in 16 BCE. Lucius Tarius Rufus had to repel a Sarmatian attack on Thracia and Macedonia, while further attacks around 10 BCE and 2 BCE were defeated by Gnaeus Cornelius Lentulus.

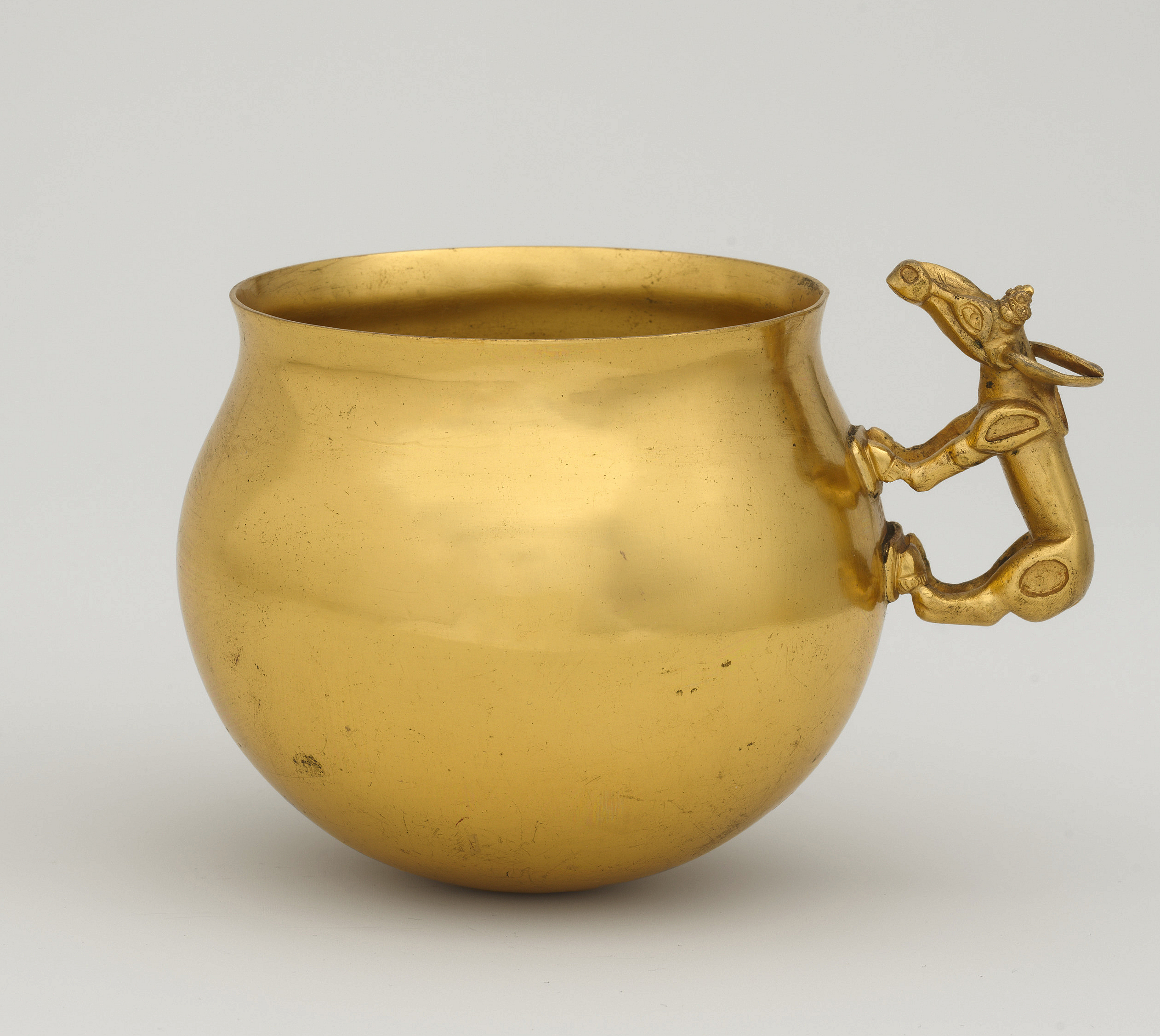
Sarmatian cup with animal handle (1st century CE, reproduction)

Meanwhile, other Sarmatian tribes, possibly the Aorsi, sent ambassadors to the Roman emperor Augustus, who tried to establish a diplomatic accommodation with them. During the 1st century CE, the Siraces and Aorsi, who were mutually hostile, participated in the Roman–Bosporan War on opposite sides: the Siraces and their king Zorsines allied with Mithridates III against his half-brother Cotys I, who was allied with Rome and the Aorsi. With the defeat of Mithridates, the Siraces were also routed and lost rulership over most of their lands. Between 50 and 60 CE, the Alans had appeared in the foothills of the Caucasus, from where they attacked the Caucasus and Transcaucasus areas and the Parthian Empire. During the 1st century CE, the Alans expanded across the Volga to the west, absorbing part of the Aorsi and displacing the rest, and pressure from the Alans forced the Iazyges and Roxolani to continue attacking the Roman Empire from across the Danube. During the 1st century CE, two Sarmatian rulers from the steppe named Pharzoios and Inismeōs were minting coins in Pontic Olbia.

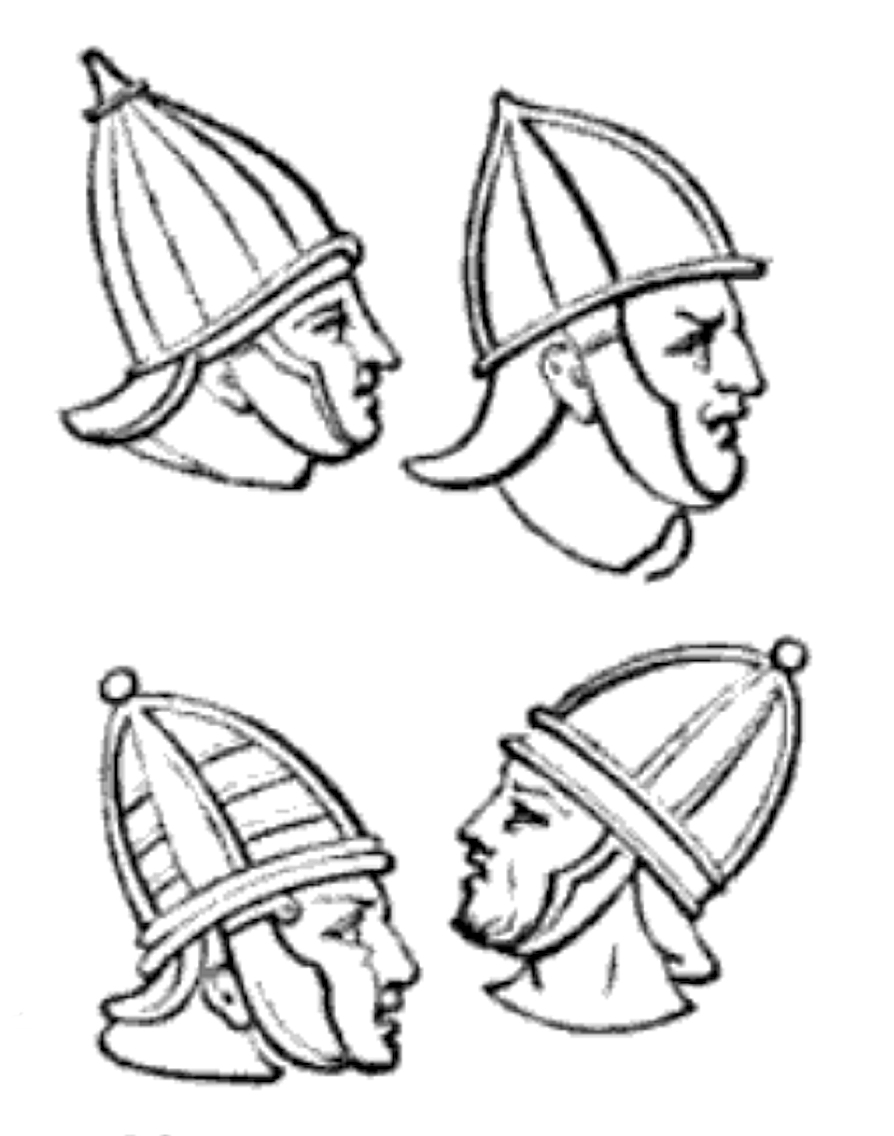
Headgear of the Sarmatians in Trajan's column

The Roxolani continued their westward migration following the conflict on the Bosporan Chersonesus, and by 69 CE they were close enough to the lower Danube that they were able to attack across the river when it was frozen in winter, and soon later they and the Alans were living on the coast of the Black Sea, and they later moved further west and were living in the areas corresponding to modern-day Moldavia and western Ukraine.

In 72 CE, the Alans invaded in Parthian Empire and its Vassals through the Caucasus, plundering Media and Armenia.

The Sarmatian tribe of the Arraei, who had had close contacts with the Romans, eventually settled to the south of the Danube river, in Thrace, and another Sarmatian tribe, the Koralloi, were also living in the same area alongside a section of the Scythian Sindi.

During the 1st and 2nd centuries CE, the Iazyges often bothered the Roman authorities in Pannonia; they participated in the destruction of the Quadian kingdom of Vannius, and often migrated to the east across the Transylvanian Plateau and the Carpathian Mountains during seasonal movements or for trade.

By the 2nd century CE, the Alans had conquered the steppes of the north Caucasus and of the north Black Sea area and created a powerful confederation of tribes under their rule. Under the hegemony of the Alans a trade route connected the Pontic Steppe, the southern Urals, and the region presently known as Western Turkestan. One group of the Alans, the Antae, migrated north into the territory of what is presently Poland.

=== Decline ===
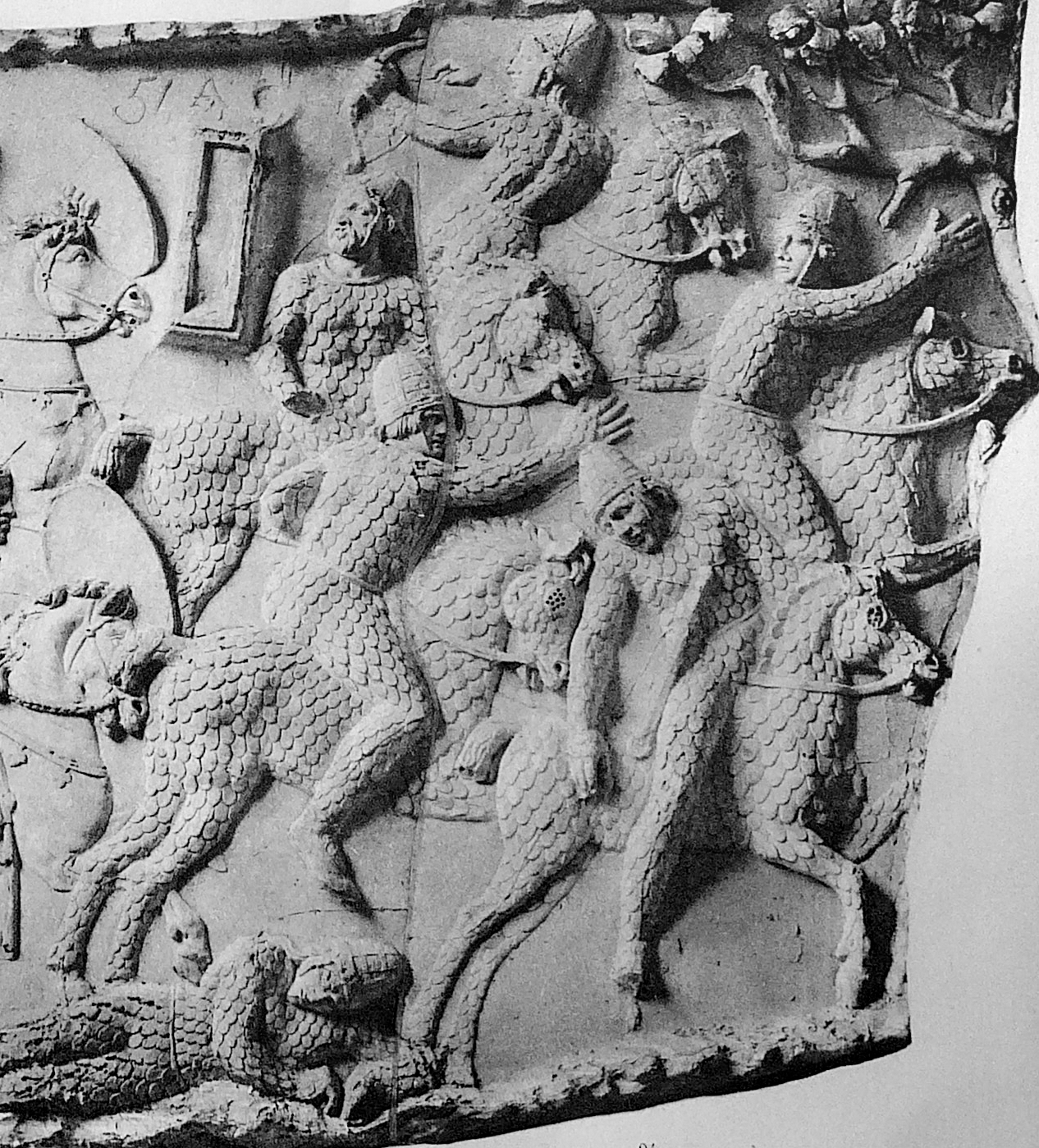
Sarmatian cataphracts during Dacian Wars as depicted on Trajan's Column.

The hegemony of the Sarmatians in the steppes began to decline over the 2nd and 3rd centuries CE, when the Huns conquered Sarmatian territory in the Caspian Steppe and the Ural region. The supremacy of the Sarmatians was finally destroyed when the Germanic Goths migrating from the Baltic Sea region conquered the Pontic Steppe around 200. In 375, the Huns conquered most of the Alans living to the east of the Don river, massacred a significant number of them, and absorbed them into their tribal polity, while the Alans to the west of the Don remained free from Hunnish domination. As part of the Hunnic state, the Alans participated in the Huns' defeat and conquest of the kingdom of the Ostrogoths on the Pontic Steppe. Some free Alans fled into the mountains of the Caucasus, where they participated in the ethnogenesis of populations including the Ossetians and the Kabardians, and other Alan groupings survived in Crimea. Others migrated into Central and then Western Europe, from where some of them went to Britannia and Hispania, and some joined the Germanic Vandals into crossing the Strait of Gibraltar and creating the Vandal Kingdom in North Africa.

The Sarmatians in the Bosporan Kingdom assimilated into the Greek civilization. Others assimilated with the proto-Circassian Meot people, and may have influenced the Circassian language. Some Sarmatians were absorbed by the Alans and Goths. During the Early Middle Ages, the Proto-Slavic population of Eastern Europe assimilated and absorbed Sarmatians during the political upheavals of that era. However, a people related to the Sarmatians, known as the Alans, survived in the North Caucasus into the Early Middle Ages, ultimately giving rise to the modern Ossetic ethnic group.

== Archaeology ==
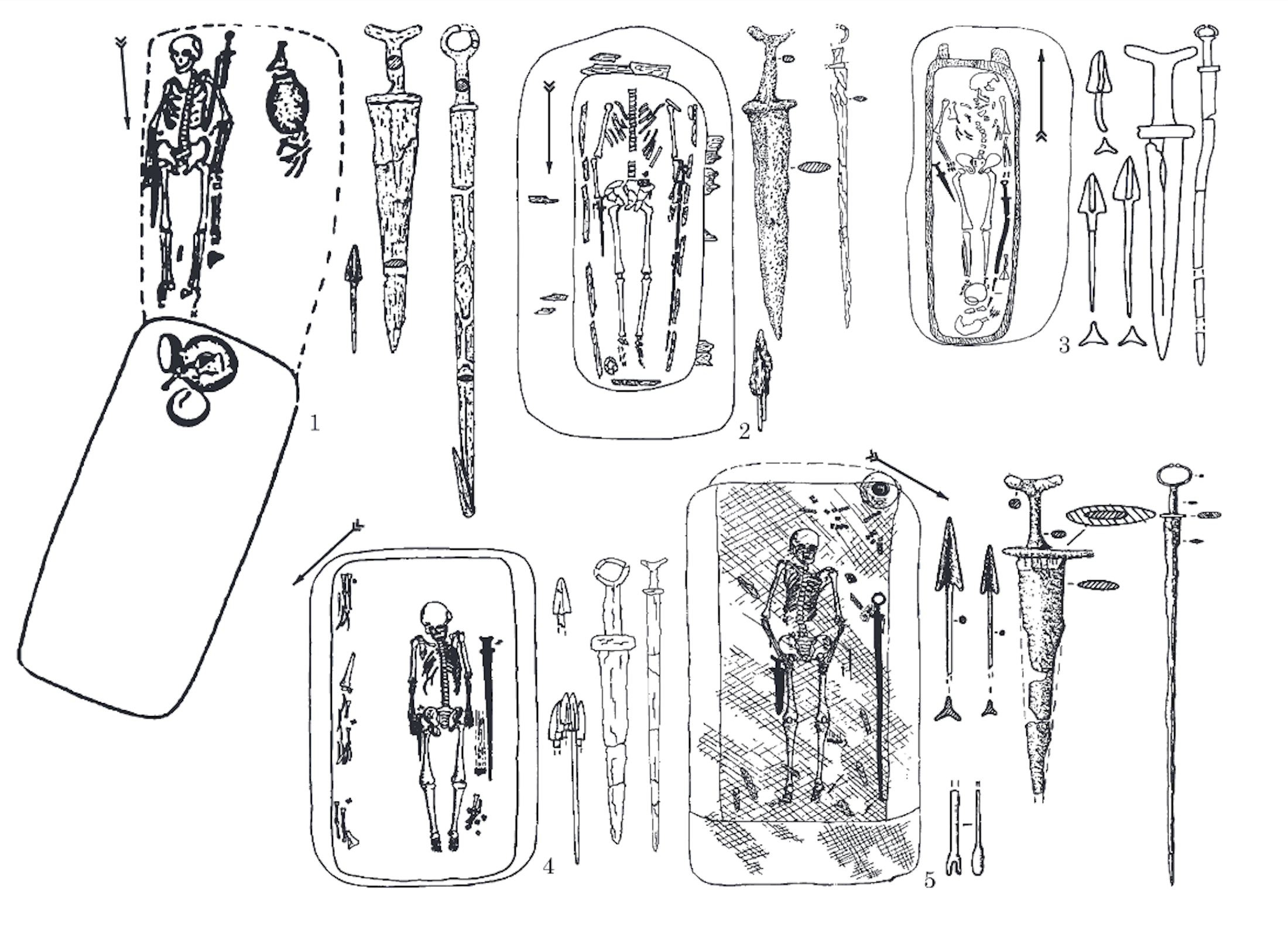
Lower-Volga Sarmatian burials, 2nd-1st centuries BCE. The burials have two types of swords: swords with traditional Sarmatian crescent-shaped pommels and swords with Asian ring pommels, indicative of the influx of new populations from Central Asia.

In 1947, Soviet archaeologist Boris Grakov defined a culture flourishing from the 6th century BCE to the 4th century CE, apparent in late kurgan graves (buried within earthwork mounds), sometimes reusing part of much older kurgans. It was a nomadic steppe culture ranging from the Black Sea eastward to beyond the Volga that is especially evident at two of the major sites at Kardaielova and Chernaya in the trans-Uralic steppe. The four phases – distinguished by grave construction, burial customs, grave goods, and geographical spread – are:

1. Sauromatian, 6th–5th centuries BCE, also called the "Blumenfeld culture"
2. Early Sarmatian, 4th–2nd centuries BCE, also called the "Prokhorovka culture"
3. Middle Sarmatian, late 2nd century BCE to late 2nd century CE, also called the "Suslov culture"
4. Late Sarmatian, late 2nd century CE to 4th century CE, also called the "Shipov culture"

While "Sarmatian" and "Sauromatian" are synonymous as ethnonyms, by convention they are given different meanings as archaeological technical terms. The term "Prokhorovka culture" derives from a complex of mounds in the Prokhorovski District, Orenburg region, excavated by S. I. Rudenko in 1916.

Reportedly, during 2001 and 2006 a great Late Sarmatian pottery centre was unearthed near Budapest, Hungary in the Üllő5 archaeological site. Typical grey, granular Üllő5 ceramics form a distinct group of Sarmatian pottery is found ubiquitously in the north-central part of the Great Hungarian Plain region, indicating a lively trading activity.

A 1998 paper on the study of glass beads found in Sarmatian graves suggests wide cultural and trade links.

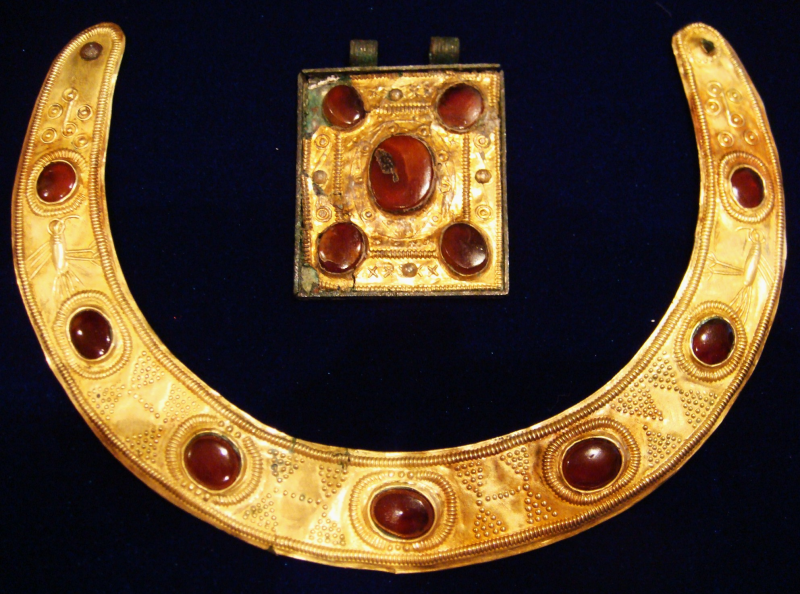
A Sarmatian-Parthian gold necklace and amulet, second century CE - Tamoikin Art Fund.

A 2023 paper on a grave discovered in Cambridgeshire, England found via archaeogenetics that the person had Sarmatian-related ancestry, and was not related to the local population. Stable isotope analysis of his teeth determined that he had probably migrated long distances twice in his life. One tooth was radiocarbon dated to cal 126-228 CE.

Archaeological evidence suggests that Scythian-Sarmatian cultures may have given rise to the Greek legends of Amazons. Graves of armed women have been found in southern Ukraine and Russia. David Anthony noted that approximately 20% of Scythian-Sarmatian "warrior graves" on the lower Don and lower Volga contained women dressed for battle as warriors and he asserts that encountering that cultural phenomenon "probably inspired the Greek tales about the Amazons."

== Ethnology ==
A Sarmatian diadem, found at the Khokhlach kurgan near Novocherkassk (first century CE, Hermitage Museum).

The Sarmatians were part of the Iranian steppe peoples, among whom were also Scythians and Saka. These also are grouped together as "East Iranians." Archaeology has established the connection 'between the Iranian-speaking Scythians, Sarmatians, and Saka and the earlier Timber-grave and Andronovo cultures'. Based on building construction, these three peoples were the likely descendants of those earlier archaeological cultures. The Sarmatians and Saka used the same stone construction methods as the earlier Andronovo culture. The Timber grave (Srubnaya culture) and Andronovo house building traditions were further developed by these three peoples. Andronovo pottery was continued by the Saka and Sarmatians.

The first Sarmatians are mostly identified with the Prokhorovka culture, which moved from the southern Urals to the Lower Volga and then to the northern Pontic steppe, in the fourth–third centuries BCE. During the migration, the Sarmatian population seems to have grown and they divided themselves into several groups, such as the Alans, Aorsi, Roxolani, and Iazyges. By 200 BCE, the Sarmatians replaced the Scythians as the dominant people of the steppes. The Sarmatians and Scythians had fought on the Pontic steppe to the north of the Black Sea. The Sarmatians, described as a large confederation, were to dominate these territories over the next five centuries. According to Brzezinski and Mielczarek, the Sarmatians were formed between the Don River and the Ural Mountains. Pliny the Elder wrote that they ranged from the Vistula River (in present-day Poland) to the Danube.

== Culture ==
=== Language ===
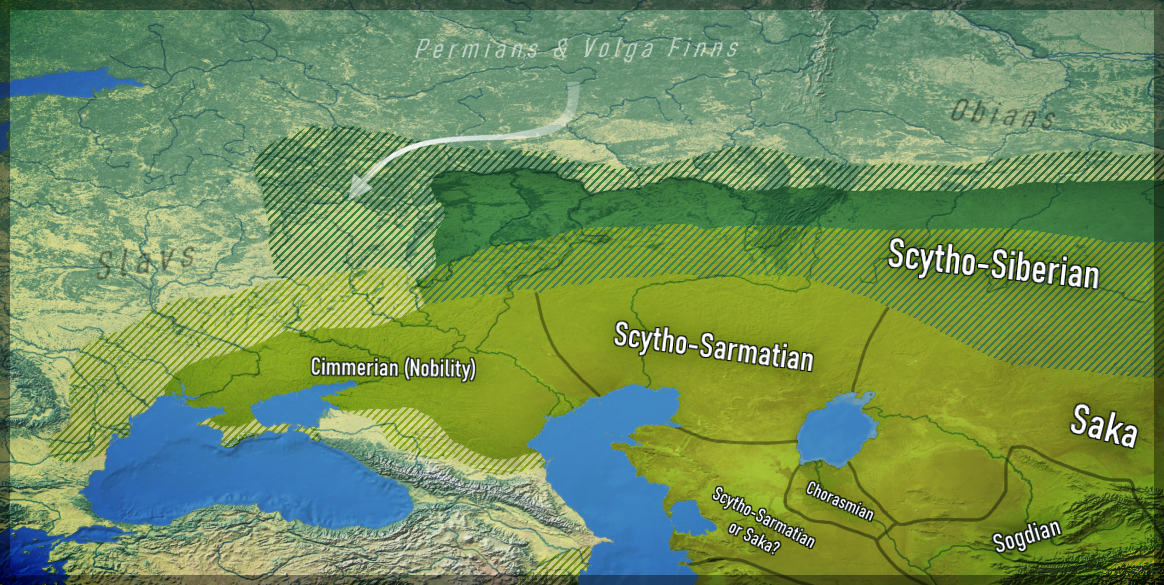
Iranic peoples of Central Asia during the Iron Age, including Sarmatians

The Sarmatians spoke an Iranian language that was descended from Proto-Iranian and was heterogenous. By the first century CE, the Iranian tribes in what is today South Russia spoke different languages or dialects, clearly distinguishable. According to a group of Iranologists writing in 1968, the numerous Iranian personal names in Greek inscriptions from the Black Sea coast indicate that the Sarmatians spoke a North-Eastern Iranian dialect ancestral to Alanian-Ossetian. However, Harmatta (1970) argued that "the language of the Sarmatians or that of the Alans as a whole cannot be simply regarded as being Old Ossetian."

=== Equipment ===
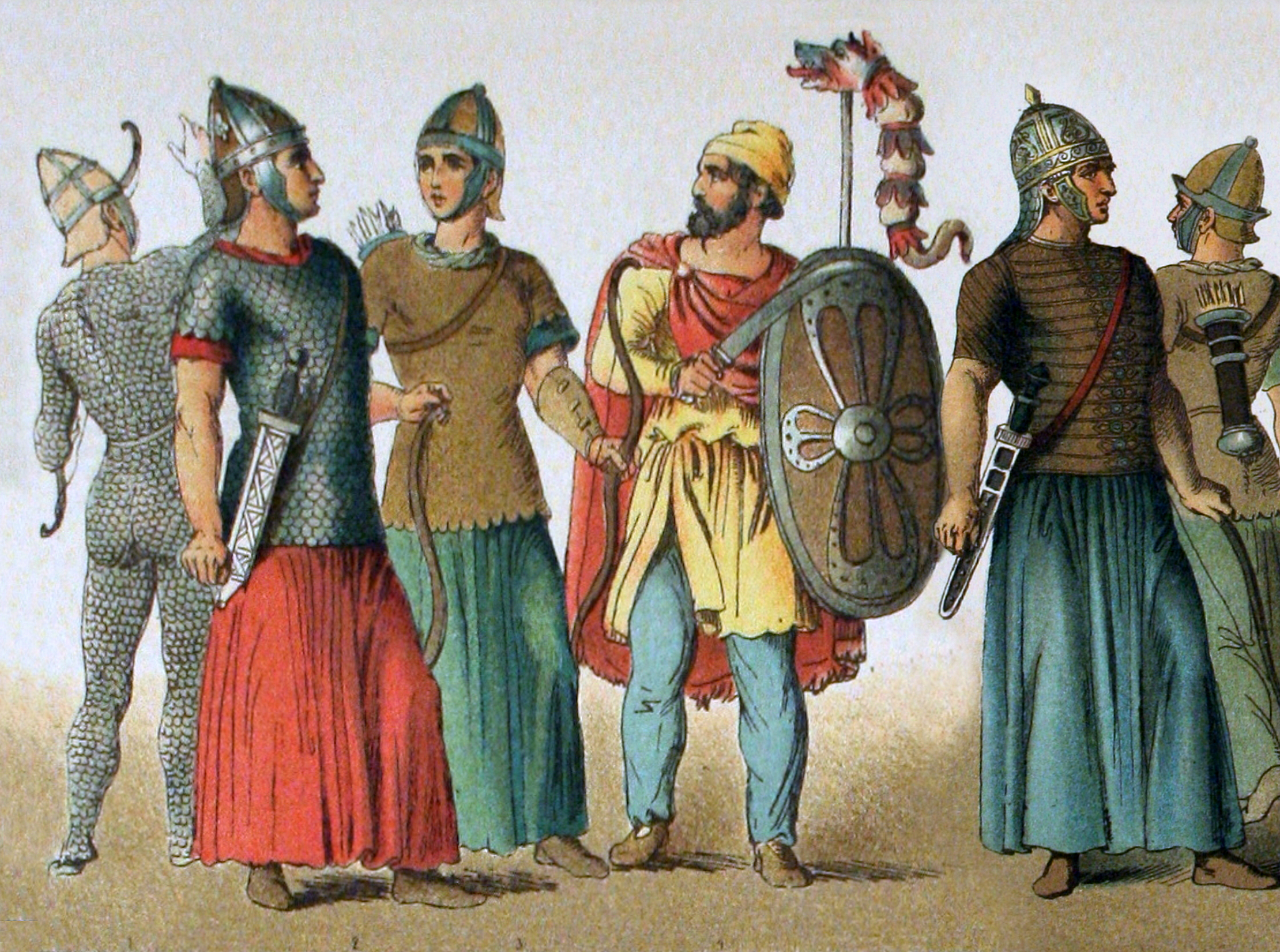
Sarmatians warriors (reconstruction)

The Roxolani, who were one of the earlier Sarmatian tribes to have migrated into Europe and therefore were among the more geographically western Sarmatians, used helmets and corselets made of raw ox hide, and wicker shields, as well as spears, bows, and swords. The Roxolani adopted these forms of armour and weaponry from the Germanic Bastarnae near whom they lived. The more eastern Sarmatian tribes used scale armour and used a long lance called the contus and bows in battle.

=== Art ===
The artworks of the Sarmatians, which reflect Chinese and Persian influence, survive mainly in the form of metalwork. It can be difficult to distinguish Sarmatian archaeological finds from those of the Huns, as both peoples lived in close proximity and seem to have had very similar material cultures. Their steppe-art styles influenced subsequent artistic developments in medieval Europe.

The early Sarmatians already possessed the technique of decorating with gold inclusions, observed in Achaemenid metalwork. It was spread by nomads in the Eurasian steppes during the 7th-5th centuries BCE, from the Altai Mountains (Arzhan-2 kurgan) westward to central Kazakhstan and the southern Urals. Tsar Peter the Great particularly cherished his Demidov Gift, a Sarmatian gold collection, now exhibited in the Gold Chamber at the Hermitage Museum in Saint Petersburg. The Novocherkassk Treasure with the famous Sarmatian Diadem adorned with a Tree of Life can also be seen in the Hermitage Gold Room. It is a Sarmatian hoard of gold, silver and bronze articles and jewellery discovered in the Khokhlach barrow in Novocherkassk in 1864. Chronologically it belongs to the first and second centuries CE.

Numerous weapons, armour, helmets had already been found in the excavations of the Early Sarmatian Filippovka kurgan (dated to c. 450-300 BCE):

Many Chinese mirrors occur in graves of the Middle-Sarmatian to Late-Sarmatian periods.

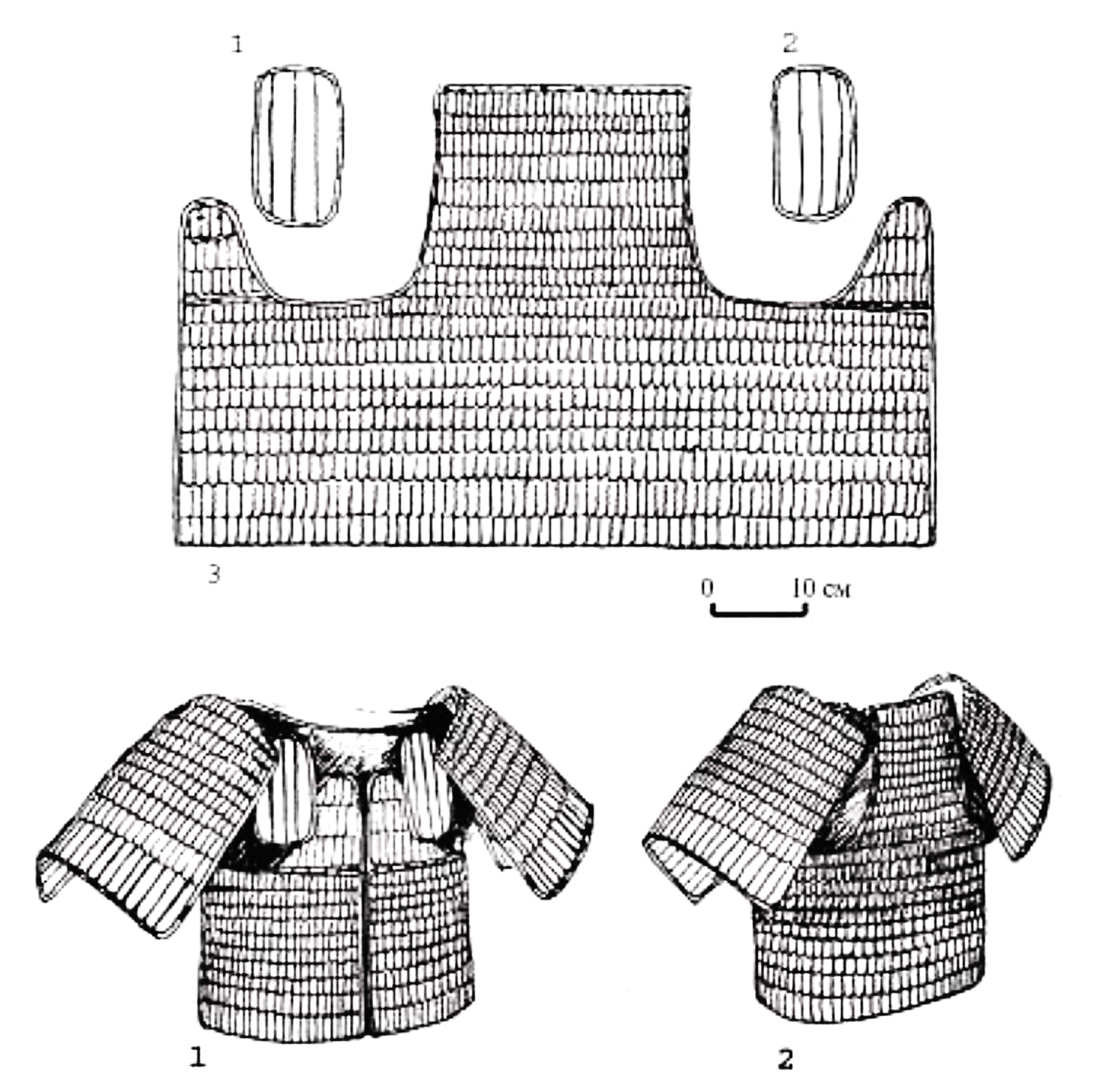
Filippovka 1 Iron armour from burial 2 mound 4

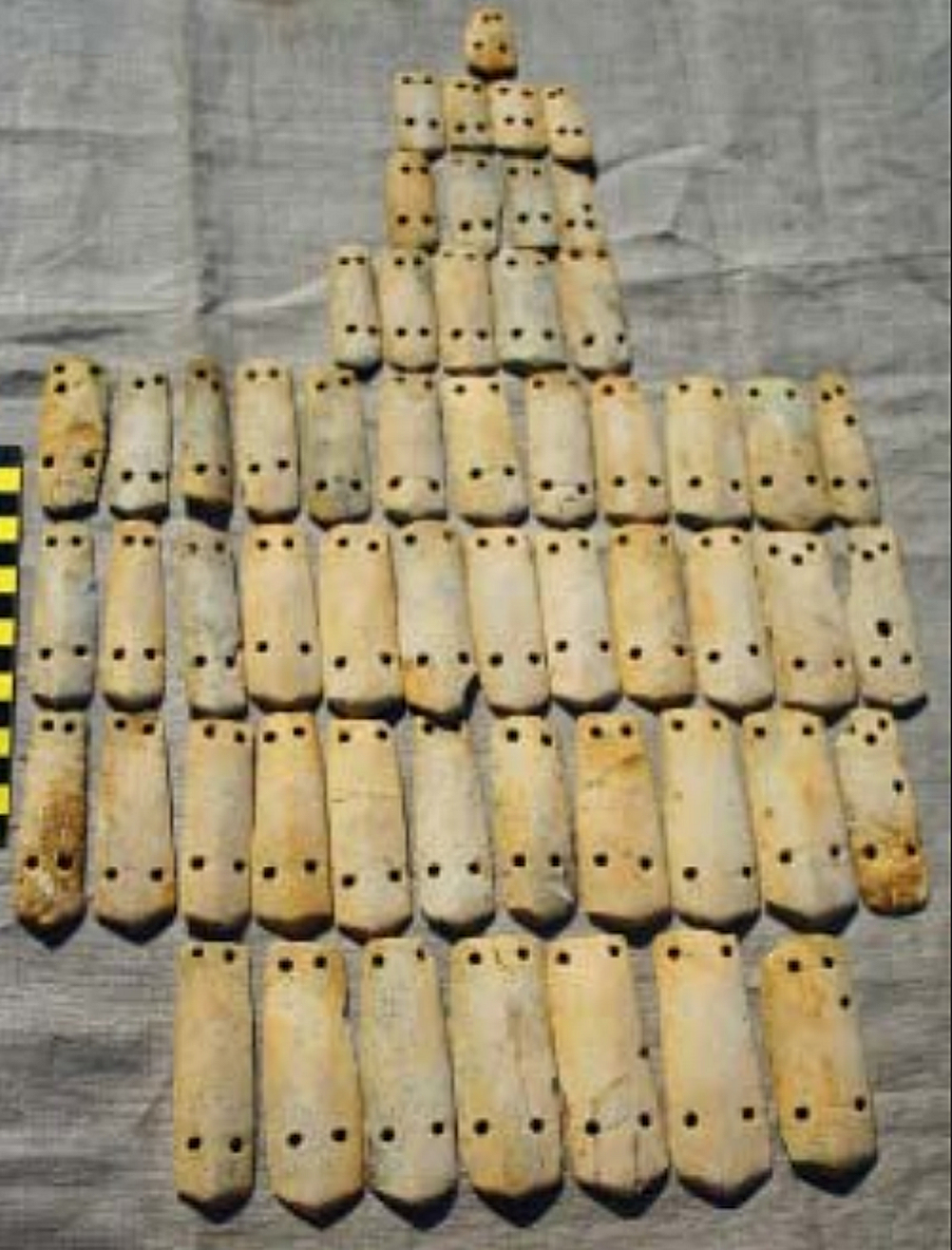
Filippovka 1, Horn armour from mound 29

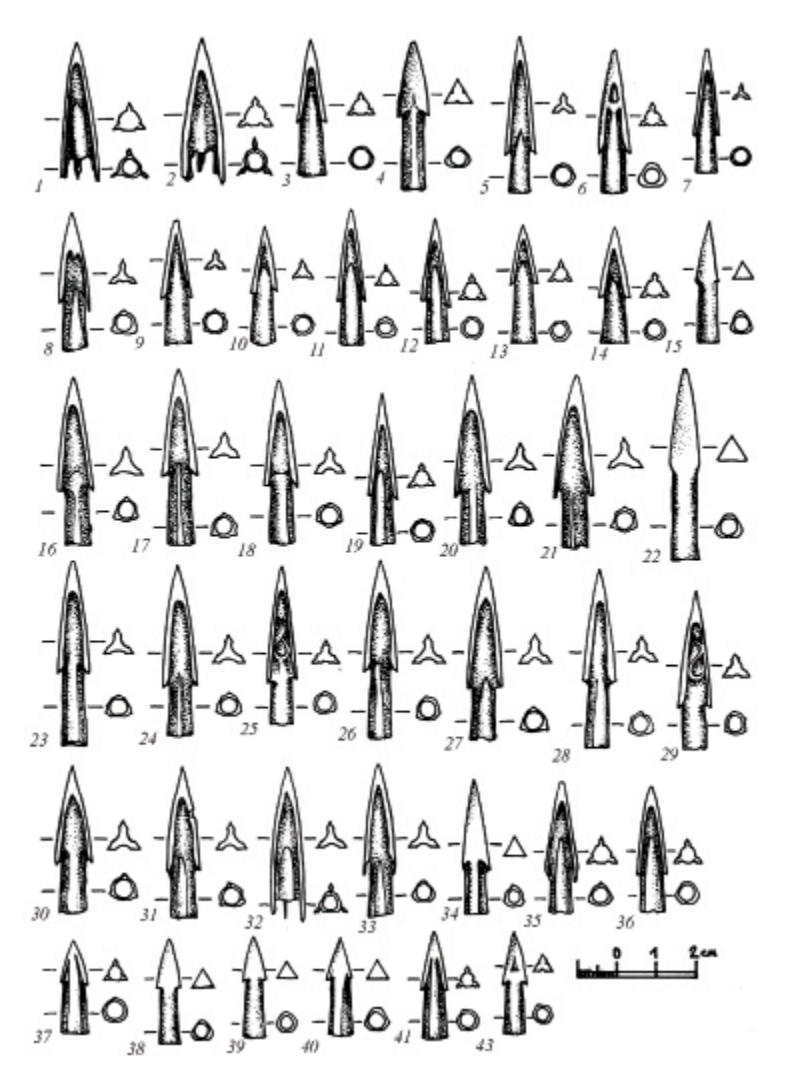
Filippovka 1, bronze arrowheads from burial 2, mound 4

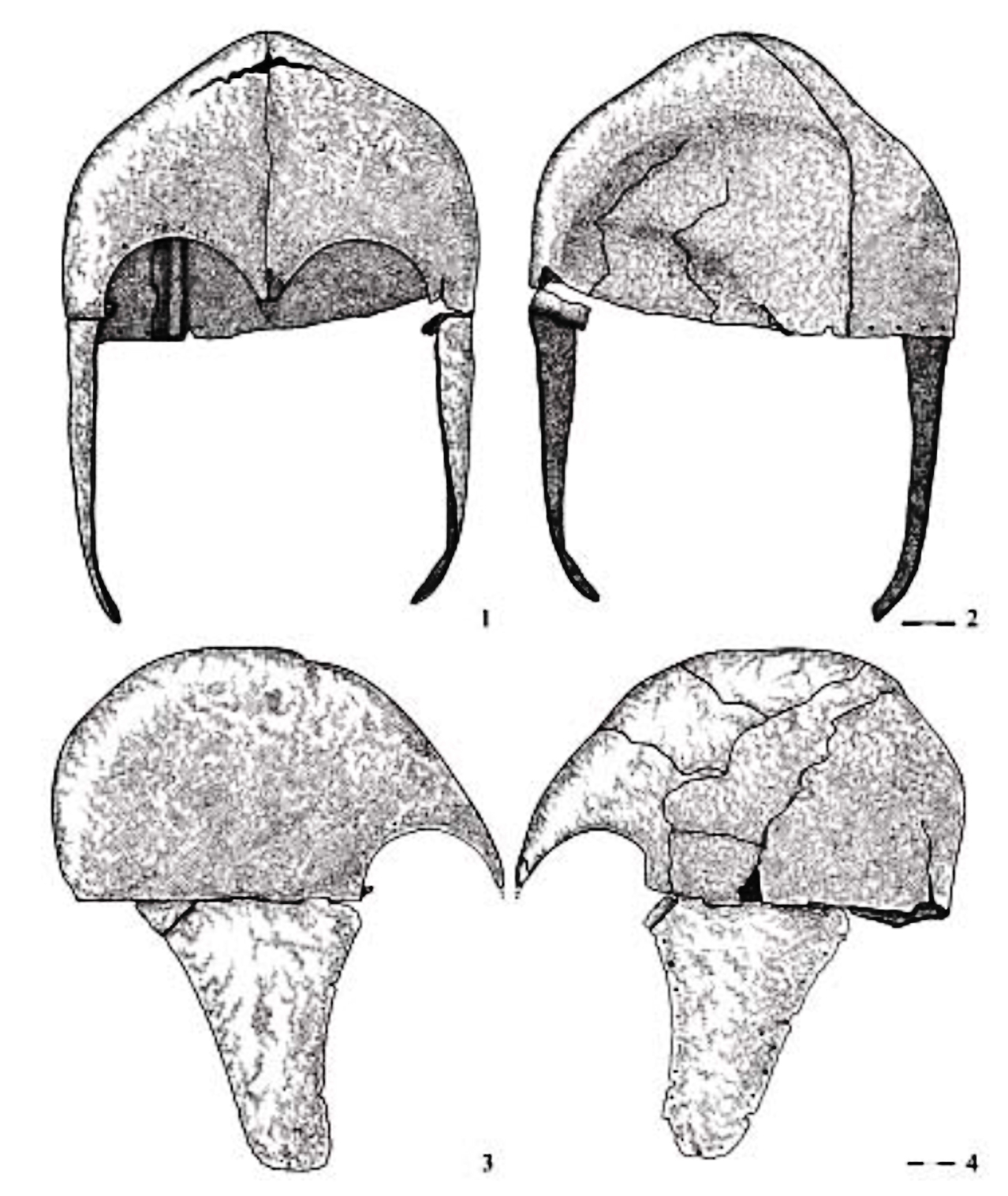
Filippovka 1, iron helmets from mound 11

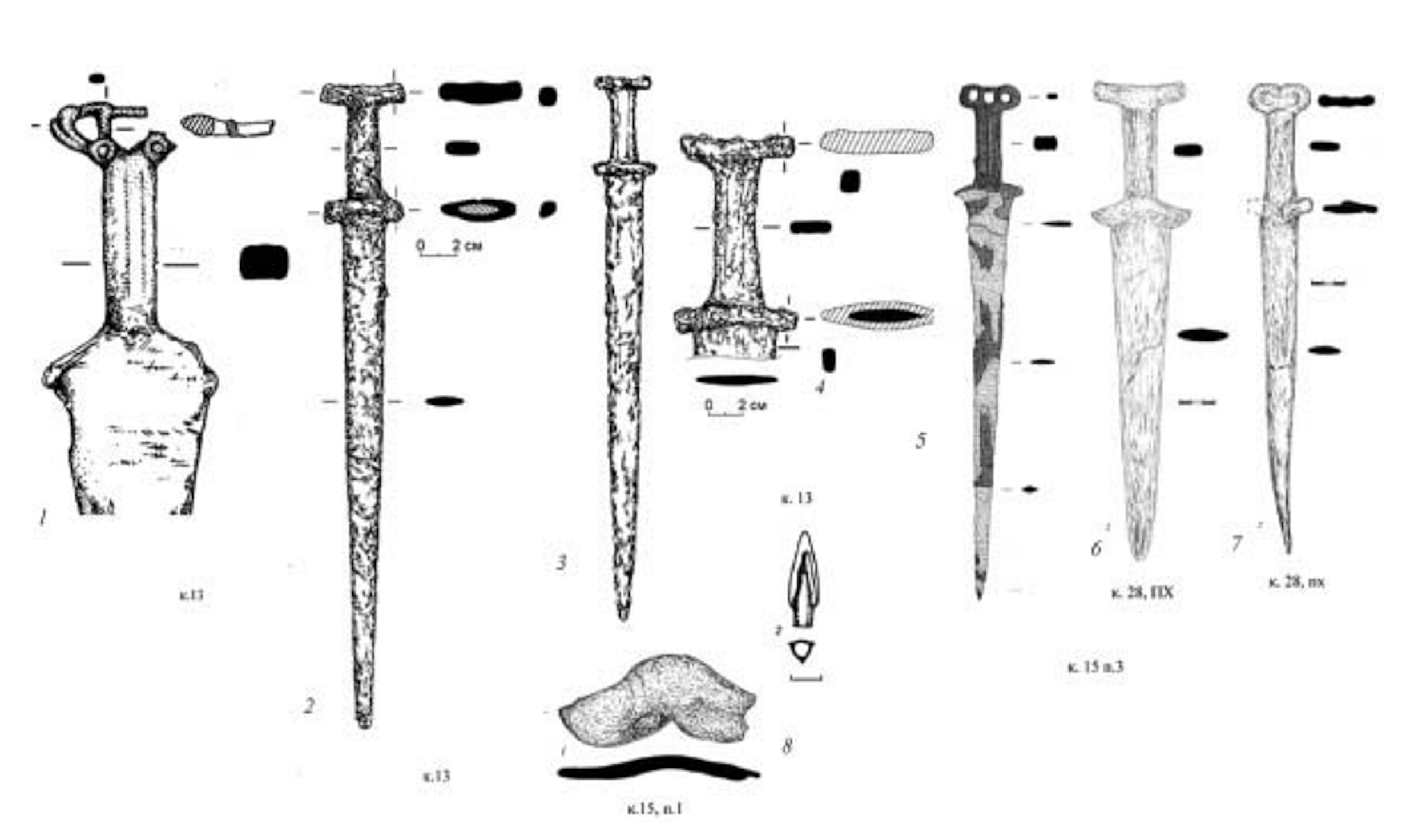
Filippovka 1, iron swords and daggers

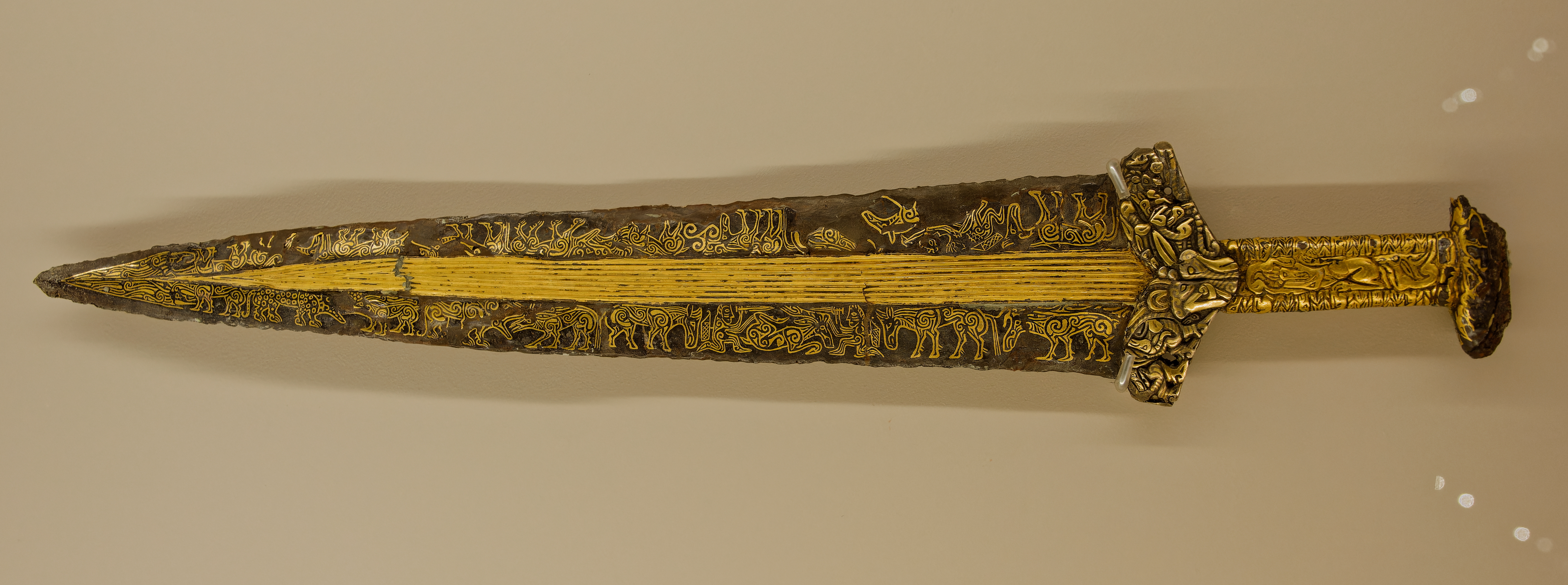
Filippovka 1, bronze and inlaid gold dagger

== Genetics ==
=== Autosomal DNA ===
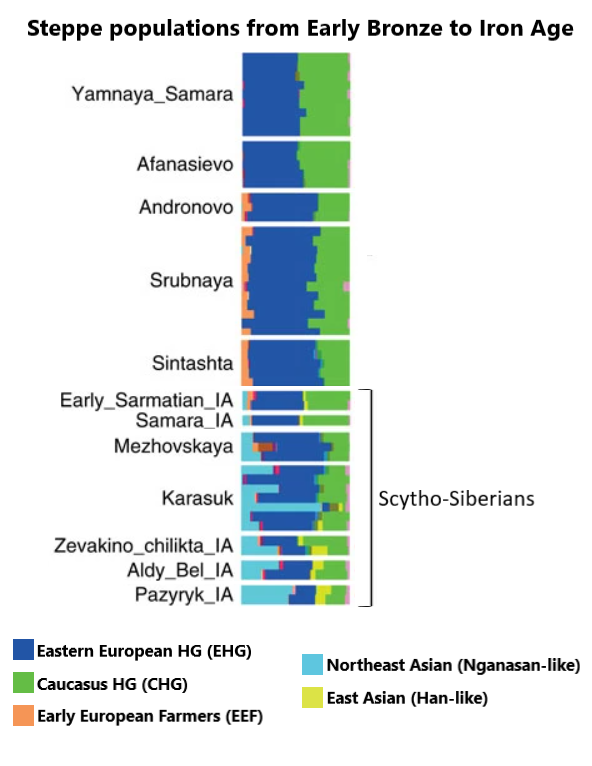
Genetic makeup of Bronze and Iron Age Steppe populations

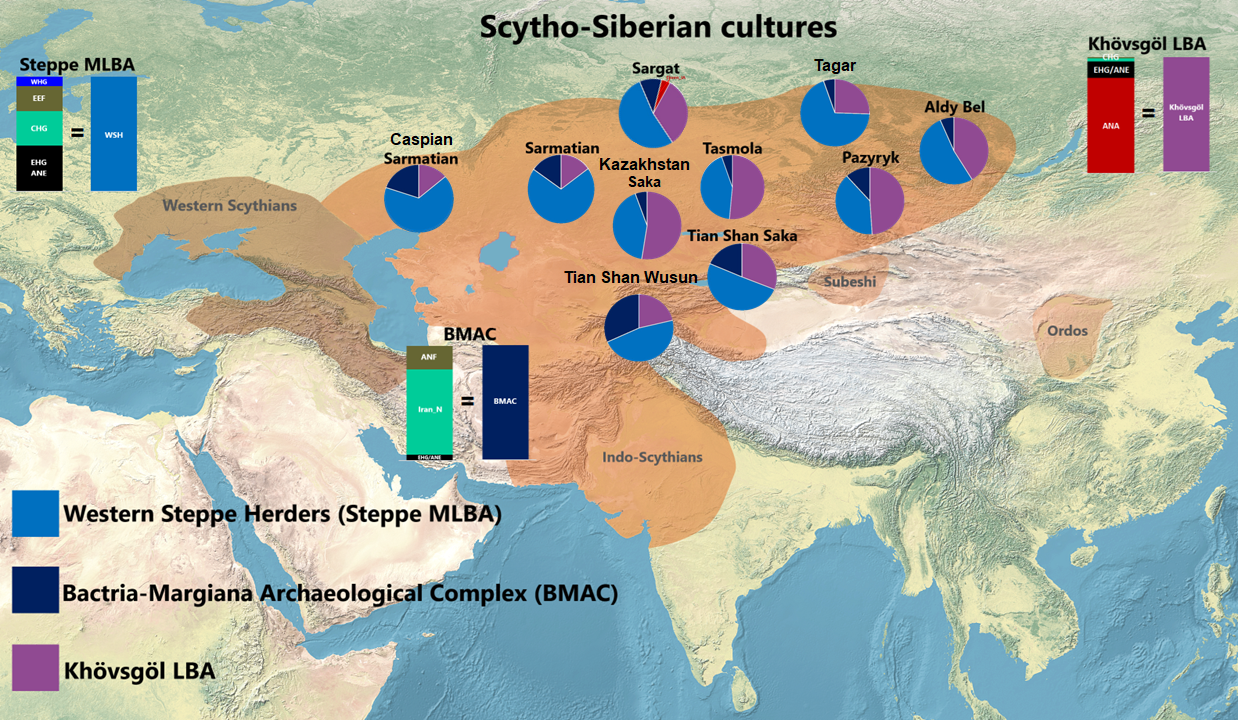
Map of Scythian cultures, including different Saka populations with genetic profiles

Sarmatians emerged primarily from the Bronze and Iron Age Western Steppe Herders (Steppe_MLBA), associated with the Sintashta, Srubnaya and Andronovo cultures, but also carried a small amount of admixed from an East Asian-derived population represented by Khövsgöl LBA groups, which may have been indirectly mediated via contact with the related Saka from the Altai region, which are regarded as the oldest Scythoid cultural group. The Sarmatians also received geneflow from an ancient Iranian population associated with the Bactria–Margiana Archaeological Complex.

A genetic study published in Current Biology in 2022, regarding the genetic origin of Huns, Avars, and conquering Hungarians, analyzed 265 ancient genomes. The study concluded that the Hungarian conquerors can be modeled as ~50% Mansi-like, ~35% Sarmatian-like, and ~15% Hun/Xiongnu-like. Sarmatian ancestry was also detected among several Hun samples which implies a significant Sarmatian influence on European Huns.

A genetic study published in Cell Press in December 2023 examined the remains obtained from Roman sites close to the limes (such as Viminacium) dated to the 3rd century or later. They were shown to carry admixture from Central/North European and Sarmatian-Scythian ancestries in addition to 42%–55% local Balkan Iron Age-related ancestry. Seven out of nine males among these samples belonged to lineages not found in the Balkans earlier: haplogroups I1 and R1b-U106, with strong Northern European distribution, and haplogroup R-Z93, common in the Steppe during the Iron Age and early 1st millennium CE. Many of these samples suggest that admixture between Central/North European and Sarmatian-Scythian ancestries likely occurred beyond the frontier prior to the movement into the Roman Empire.

Evidence for a subsequent eastward expansion of Sarmatian-related ancestry is also found in a Saka-associated individual from southeastern Kazakhstan (Konyr Tobe 300CE), whose genetic profile consisted of approximately 85% Sarmatian-related ancestry and 15% additional ancestry associated with the Bactria–Margiana Archaeological Complex (BMAC). Sarmatian-like contributions have also been detected among some Xiongnu remains. A 2024 study published in Nature suggested that the majority of individuals from medieval Poland derived, on average, approximately 49% of their ancestry from a genetic component associated with Hungarian Scythians or Slovakian La Tène individuals, up to 44% from ancestry related to Roman Iron Age populations of Lithuania, "which is similar to ancestries of individuals from middle to late Bronze Age Poland", and around 7% from Sarmatian groups of the Caucasus.

=== Haplogroups ===
Afanasiev et al. (2014) analyzed ten Alanic burials on the Don River. Four of them carried Y-DNA Haplogroup G2 and six of them possessed mtDNA haplogroup I.

In 2015, again Afanasiev et al. analyzed skeletons of various Sarmato-Alan and Saltovo-Mayaki culture Kurgan burials. The two Alan samples from the fourth to sixth century AD belonged to Y-DNA haplogroups G2a-P15 and R1a-Z94, while two of the three Sarmatian samples from the second to third century CE found to belong to Y-DNA haplogroup J1-M267, and one belonged to R1a. Three Saltovo-Mayaki samples from the eighth to ninth century CE turned out to have Y-DNA corresponding to haplogroups G, J2a-M410 and R1a-z94.

A genetic study published in Nature Communications in March 2017 examined several Sarmatian individuals buried in Pokrovka, Russia (southwest of the Ural Mountains) between the fifth century BCE and the second century BCE. The sample of Y-DNA extracted belonged to haplogroup R1b1a2a2. This was the dominant lineage among males of the earlier Yamnaya culture. The eleven samples of mtDNA extracted belonged to the haplogroups U3, M, U1a'c, T, F1b, N1a1a1a1a, T2, U2e2, H2a1f, T1a, and U5a1d2b. The Sarmatians examined were found to be closely related to peoples of the earlier Yamnaya culture and to the Poltavka culture.

A genetic study published in Nature in May 2018 examined the remains of twelve Sarmatians buried between 400 BCE and 400 CE. The five samples of Y-DNA extracted belonged to haplogroup R1a1, I2b, R (two samples), and R1. The eleven samples of mtDNA extracted belonged to C4a1a, U4a2 (two samples), C4b1, I1, A, U2e1h (two samples), U4b1a4, H28, and U5a1.

A genetic study published in Science Advances in October 2018 examined the remains of five Sarmatians buried between 55 CE and 320 CE. The three samples of Y-DNA extracted belonged to haplogroup R1a1a and R1b1a1a2 (two samples), while the five samples of mtDNA extracted belonged to haplogroup H2a, T1a1, U5b2b (two samples), and D4q.

A genetic study published in Current Biology in July 2019 examined the remains of nine Sarmatians from the southern Ural Mountains and of a single Sarmatian from North Caucasus buried between 7th and 2nd century BCE. The Uralic Sarmatians were found to be carrying the paternal haplogroups R1a1e-CTS1123, R1a-Z645 (two samples), and E1b1b-PF6746, while the nine maternal lineages extracted belonged to haplogroups W3a, T1a1, U5a2, U5b2a1a2, T1a1d, C1e, U5b2a1a1, U5b2c and U5b2c. The single Sarmatian from North Caucasus belonged to paternal lineage Q1c-L332 and maternal haplogroup W.

A archaeogenetic study published in Cell in 2022, analyzed 17 Late Sarmatian samples from 4-5th century CE from the Pannonian Basin in Hungary. The nine extracted Y-DNA belonged to the following haplogroups: I2a-CTS4348, I2a-CTS10743, I1a-S2205, I1a-Z141, I1a-DF29, G-FGC725, E-V13, R1a-Z2123 and R1b-U152. The samples of mtDNA extracted belonged to haplogroups C5c, H5, H41a, H1cf, H7, H-C16291T, H59, H1m, HV0, I1a1a, J1c3, K1a4a1 (two samples), T1a1b, T2b (two samples), U2.

== Physical appearance ==
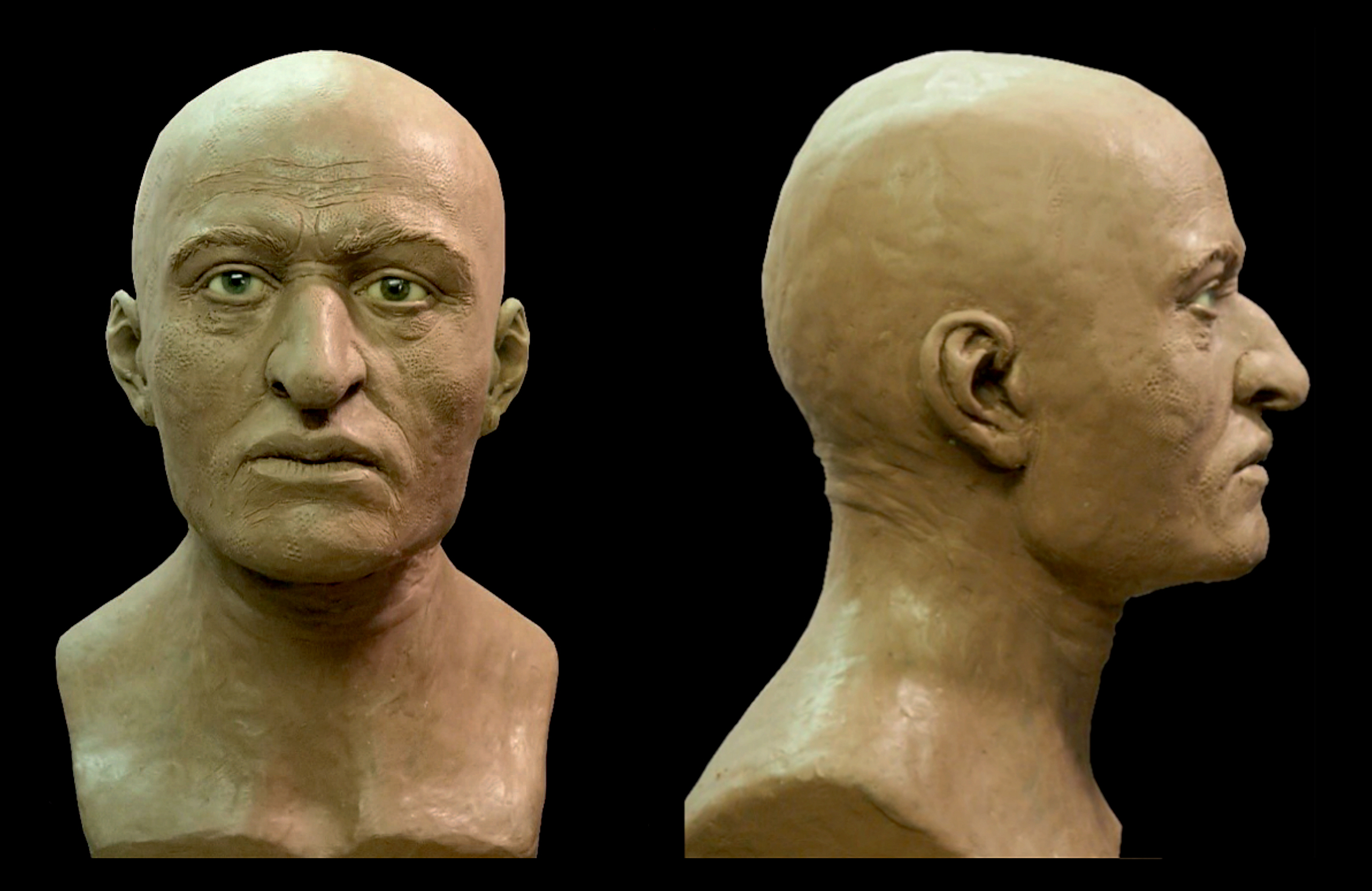
Forensic reconstruction based on the skull of a mature male (40–50 years old) from the Elton cemetery, kurgan 10, burial 9, Early Sarmatian time, 4th century BCE.

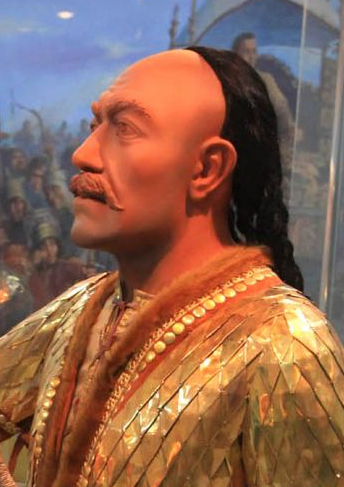
Early Sarmatian chieftain, Araltobe kurgan, 3rd-2nd century BCE.

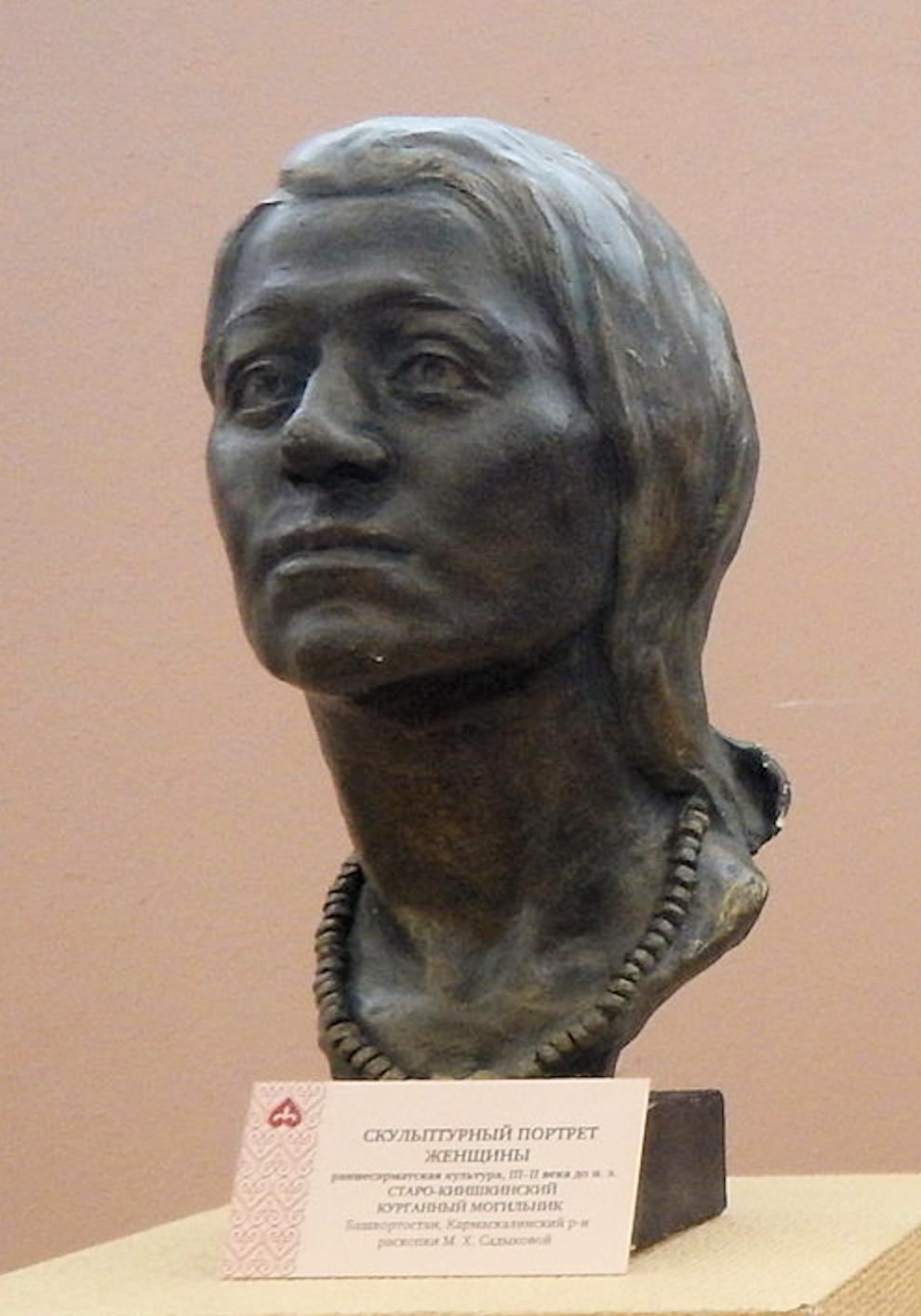
Early Sarmatian woman, 3rd-2nd century BCE, Old Knishkin burial, Bashkortostan.

The Early Sarmatians from the Filippovka kurgans are described as "basically European" with some central and eastern Asiatic features in the nasal and facial bones. Compared with classical Sauromatians, Early Sarmatians, such as those of Filippovka, generally display an increased incidence of eastern Asiatic features. They most closely resembled the Saka populations of Central Asia, particularly from the Altai region (Pazyryk), and were very different from the western Scythians, or the Sarmatians of the Volga River area.

The Roman author Ovid recorded that one of the Sarmatian tribes, the Coralli, had light hair, which is a characteristic that Ammianus Marcellinus also ascribed to the Alans. He wrote that nearly all of the Alani were "of great stature and beauty, their hair is somewhat light, their eyes are frighteningly fierce."

Modern historians have offered conflicting opinions about the description of the Alans as being tall and having blond hair. For instance, Roger Batty has posited that "presumably, only some of the Alans would have been blond". Bernard Bachrach has likewise suggested that because the Alans assimilated so many foreigners, the majority of them are unlikely to have been blond-haired, and that there was no distinguishing physical characteristic of the Alans. John Day has argued that Bachrach's analysis is flawed, because he mistranslated the original passage from Ammianus Marcellinus. Day notes that Ammianus describes the Alans as having hair mediocriter flavis (“inclining to light”), and carefully attributes to them only somewhat light hair. Iver Neumann has suggested that the description of Alans as blond may mean that their Indo-Iranian ancestry was greater than it was in the Huns. Charles Previté-Orton wrote that the Alans were only partly of Iranian heritage, and that the other part of their ancestry came from captive women and slaves.

== Legacy ==
=== Polish Sarmatism ===
Sarmatism (or Sarmatianism) is an ethno-cultural concept of the origin of Poland from Sarmatians within the Polish–Lithuanian Commonwealth. It was the dominant Baroque culture and ideology of the nobility (szlachta) that existed in times of the Renaissance to the eighteenth centuries. Together with another concept of "Golden Liberty," it formed a central aspect of the Commonwealth's culture and society. At its core was the unifying belief that the elite of the Polish Commonwealth descended from the ancient Iranic Sarmatians, the legendary invaders of Slavic lands in antiquity. In the 17th century, the Cossack hetman Bohdan Khmelnytsky, building on Polish Sarmatianism, claimed the title of "Prince of the Sarmatians".

== Peoples ==
- Alans
- Chechens
  - Ossetians
  - Jasz people
- Roxolani
- Iazyges
- Aorsi
- Arcaragantes
- Hamaxobii (possibly)
- Limigantes
- Saii
- Serboi
- Siraces
- Spali
- Taifals (possibly)
- Turcae

== See also ==
- List of ancient Iranian peoples
- Sarm
- Andronovo culture
- Alans
- Cimmerians
- Scythians
- Early Slavs
- Eurasian nomads

== Sources ==
Books

- Batty, Roger (2007). Rome and the Nomads: The Pontic-Danubian Realm in Antiquity. Oxford University Press. ISBN 978-0-198-14936-1.
- Brzezinski, Richard; Mielczarek, Mariusz (2002). The Sarmatians 600 BC–AD 450. Men-At-Arms (373). Bloomsbury USA; Osprey Publishing. ISBN 978-1-84176-485-6.
- Davis-Kimball, Jeannine; Bashilov, Vladimir A.; Yablonsky, Leonid T. (1995). Nomads of the Eurasian Steppes in the Early Iron Age. Berkeley: Zinat Press. ISBN 978-1-885979-00-1.
- Day, John V. (2001). Indo-European origins: the anthropological evidence. Institute for the Study of Man. ISBN 978-0-941694-75-9.
- Hinds, Kathryn (2009). Scythians and Sarmatians. Marshall Cavendish. ISBN 978-0-7614-4519-7.
- Istvánovits, Eszter; Kulcsár, Valéria (2017). Sarmatians: History and Archaeology of a Forgotten People. Schnell & Steiner. ISBN 978-3-7954-3234-8.
- Kozlovskaya, Valeriya (2017). The Northern Black Sea in Antiquity: networks, connectivity, and cultural interactions. Cambridge University Press. ISBN 978-1-107-01951-5.
- Kuzmina, Elena Efimovna (2007). The Origin of the Indo-Iranians. BRILL. pp. 50, 51, 56, 64, 78, 83, 220, 410. ISBN 978-90-04-16054-5.
- Melyukova, A. I. (1990). Sinor, Denis (ed.). The Cambridge History of Early Inner Asia. Vol. 1. Translated by Crookenden, Julia. Cambridge, United Kingdom; New York City, United States: Cambridge University Press. pp. 97–117. ISBN 978-0-521-24304-9.
- Mordvintseva, Valentina I. (30 August 2017). "The Sarmatians in the northern Black Sea Region". In Kozlovskaya, Valeriya (ed.). The Northern Black Sea in Antiquity. Cambridge University Press. pp. 233–283. doi:10.1017/9781139094702.011. ISBN 978-1-107-01951-5.
- Olbrycht, Marek Jan (2000). "Remarks on the Presence of Iranian Peoples in Europe and Their Asiatic Relations". Collectanea Celto-Asiatica Cracoviensia. Kraków: Księgarnia Akademicka. pp. 105–107. ISBN 978-8-371-88337-8.
- Sinor, Denis, ed. (1990). The Cambridge History of Early Inner Asia. Cambridge University Press. ISBN 978-0-521-24304-9.
- К.Ф. Смирнов (1984). Сарматы и утверждение их политического господства в Скифии. Рипол Классик. ISBN 978-5-458-40072-5.
- Sulimirski, Tadeusz (1970). The Sarmatians. Ancient People and Places, vol. 73. Praeger.

Journals

- Абрамова, М. П. (1988). "Сарматы и Северный Кавказ". Проблемы сарматской археологии и истории: 4–18.
- Damgaard, P. B.; et al. (9 May 2018). "137 ancient human genomes from across the Eurasian steppes". Nature. 557 (7705). Nature Research: 369–373. Bibcode:2018Natur.557..369D. doi:10.1038/s41586-018-0094-2. hdl:1887/3202709. PMID 29743675. S2CID 13670282.
- Genito, Bruno (1988). "The Archaeological Cultures of the Sarmatians with a Preliminary Note on the Trial-Trenches at Gyoma 133: a Sarmatian Settlement in South-Eastern Hungary (Campaign 1985)" (PDF). Annali dell'Istituto Universitario Orientale di Napoli. 42: 81–126.
- Gnecchi-Ruscone, Guido Alberto; Szécsényi-Nagy, Anna; Koncz, István; Csiky, Gergely; Rácz, Zsófia; Rohrlach, A. B.; Brandt, Guido; Rohland, Nadin; Csáky, Veronika; Cheronet, Olivia; Szeifert, Bea (14 April 2022). "Ancient genomes reveal origin and rapid trans-Eurasian migration of 7th century Avar elites". Cell. 185 (8): 1402–1413.e21. doi:10.1016/j.cell.2022.03.007. ISSN 0092-8674. PMC 9042794. PMID 35366416. S2CID 247859905.
- Järve, Mari; et al. (11 July 2019). "Shifts in the Genetic Landscape of the Western Eurasian Steppe Associated with the Beginning and End of the Scythian Dominance". Current Biology. 29 (14). Cell Press: 2430–2441. Bibcode:2019CBio...29E2430J. doi:10.1016/j.cub.2019.06.019. PMID 31303491.
- Harmatta, J. (1970). "Studies in the History and Language of the Sarmatians". Acta Antique et Archaeologica. XIII.
- Krzewińska, Maja; et al. (3 October 2018). "Ancient genomes suggest the eastern Pontic-Caspian steppe as the source of western Iron Age nomads". Science Advances. 4 (10) eaat4457. American Association for the Advancement of Science. Bibcode:2018SciA....4.4457K. doi:10.1126/sciadv.aat4457. PMC 6223350. PMID 30417088.
- Клепиков, В. М.; Скрипкин, А. С. (1997). "Ранние сарматы в контексте исторических событий Восточной Европы". Донские древности. 5: 28–40.
- Козлова, Р. М. (2004). О Сормах, Сарматах, Сорматских горах. Студії з ономастики та етимології (in Ukrainian).
- Lebedynsky, Iaroslav (2002). Les Sarmates: amazones et lanciers cuirassés entre Oural et Danube, VIIe siècle av. J.-C.-VIe siècle apr. J.-C. Errance. ISBN 978-2-87772-235-3.
- Mordvintseva, Valentina I. (2015). "Сарматы, Сарматия и Северное Причерноморье" [Sarmatia, the Sarmatians and the North Pontic Area] (PDF). Вестник древней истории [Journal of Ancient History]. 1 (292): 109–135. Archived from the original (PDF) on 16 December 2021.
- Mordvintseva, Valentina I. (2013). "The Sarmatians: The Creation of Archaeological Evidence". Oxford Journal of Archaeology. 32 (2): 203–219. doi:10.1111/ojoa.12010.
- Moshkova, M. G. (1995). "A brief review of the history of the Sauromatian and Sarmatian tribes". Nomads of the Eurasian Steppes in the Early Iron Age: 85–89.
- Perevalov, S. M. (2002). "The Sarmatian Lance and the Sarmatian Horse-Riding Posture". Anthropology & Archeology of Eurasia. 40 (4): 7–21. doi:10.2753/aae1061-195940047. S2CID 161826066.
- Rjabchikov, Sergei V. (2004). "Remarks on the Scythian, Sarmatian and Meotian Beliefs". AnthroGlobe Journal.
- Симоненко, А. В.; Лобай, Б. И. (1991). "Сарматы Северо-Западного Причерноморья в I в. н. э.". Погребения знати у с. Пороги (in Russian).
- Tokhtasyev, Sergey [in Russian] (2005). "Sauromatae - Syrmatae - Sarmatae". Херсонесский сборник [Chersonesian Collection] (in Russian). 14: 291–306.
- Unterländer, Martina; et al. (3 March 2017). "Ancestry and demography and descendants of Iron Age nomads of the Eurasian Steppe". Nature Communications. 8 14615. Nature Research. Bibcode:2017NatCo...814615U. doi:10.1038/ncomms14615. PMC 5337992. PMID 28256537.
