= Hamaxobii =

The Hamaxobii (Ancient Greek: Ἁμαξόβιοι), Anglicized Hamaxobians or Amaxobians, were a nomadic tribe who lived in chariots with leather tents mounted on them. They were Scythians. They were said to be descendants of the Medes.

According to William Smith the name Hamaxobii was merely a descriptive term rather than an actual tribe.

== Name ==
Their name means “dwellers in chariots”, and is compounded of the words ἄμαξα ("chariot"), and βίος ("life").

== Historical Mentions ==
=== Pomponius Mela ===
Pomponius Mela (§ 2.2) mentions the Hamaxobii in his work Chorographia. And calls them as Hamaxobioe.

Pomponius Mela’s map of the world, with the Hamaxobii near the Paulus Maeotis (Sea of Azov)

According to him they had gotten their name due to their use of wagons. He places the tribe near the Paulus Maeotis (Sea of Azov).

=== Pliny the Elder ===
Pliny the Elder (4.25) states that the Hamaxobii were a group of Sarmatians. And that they were equivalent to the Aorsi.

Strabo (11.2) describes the Aorsi, and Siraces as being Wagon-dwellers, which is similar to the wagon lifestyle Pomponius Mela had described the Hamaxobii as being.

=== Ptolemy ===
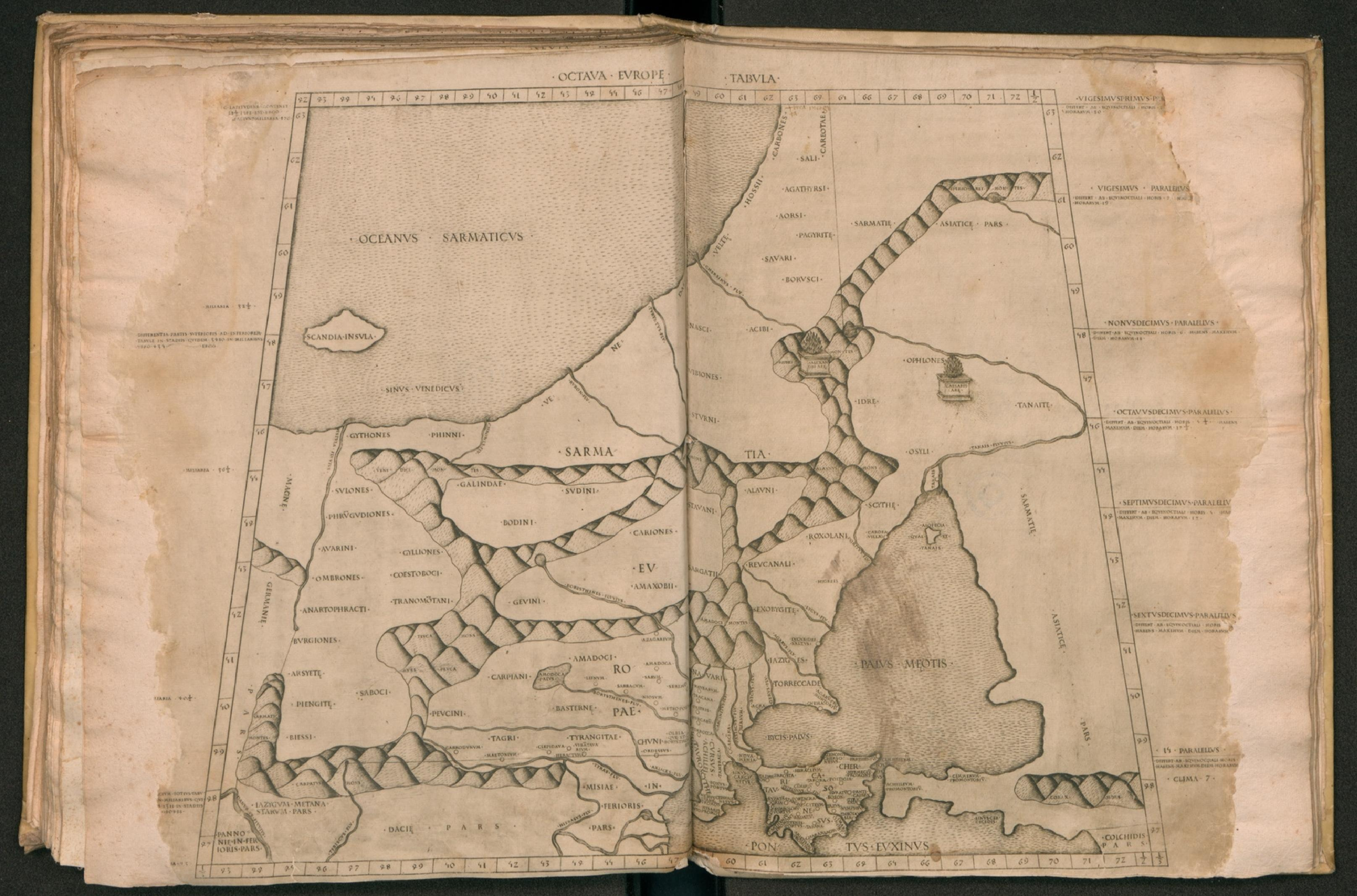
Ptolemy’s map of Sarmatia with the Hamaxobii near the Borysthenes (Dnieper), and the Exobygitae near the Roxolani.

Ptolemy places the Hamaxobii further west than other ancient authors having placed them near the Borysthenes (Dnieper).

Ptolemy also mentions a tribe called the Exobygitae dwelling between the Roxolani, and the Hamaxobii. Whom Gudmund Schütte links to the Hamaxobii. With the by in the tribe's name being as misreading of the bii in the name Hamaxobii Scithae. And the gitae in its name being a vulgar Latin form of Scithae.
