= Üllő5 =

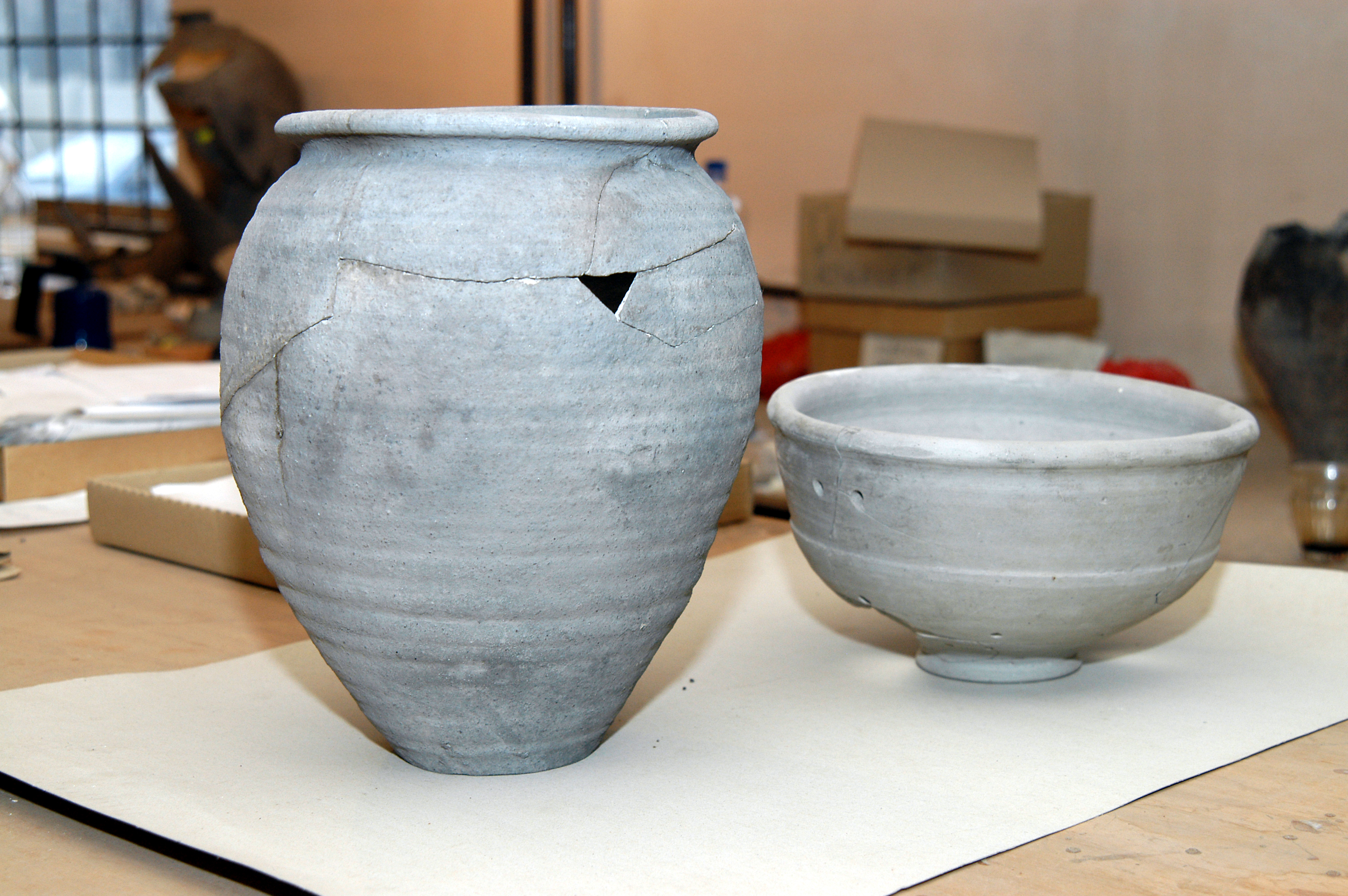
Üllő5 Sarmatian pottery

Üllő5 is an archeological site in Hungary, near the town of Üllő, next to Budapest. It was excavated between 2002 and 2006 when the southeastern section of the M0 motorway, the bypass road of Budapest, was built. It was the greatest excavation in the history of Hungarian archeology; 40 hectares were excavated, yielding a total of 8,200 objects. Due to the huge territory to be covered and the sheer number of workers and machines involved, six archeological teams worked together simultaneously on the excavation, although only part of the territory has thus far been excavated.

== Historical background ==
Üllő5 was an important centre of Late Sarmatian pottery in the 3-4th centuries AD. The people of this populous village made fireproof cooking pots and vessels. Although the clay is only medium quality, its stratum is situated one or two meters below the surface. Typical gray, granular Üllő5 pottery was found everywhere in the north-central part of the Great Hungarian Plain, indicating lively trading activity in the region.

This pottery tradition continued in the Age of Migrations well until the Early Middle Ages and the time of the Árpáds, in spite of the frequent changes of the local population.

== Significance ==
The artefacts unearthed in Üllő5 shed a new light on the Late Antique era of the Sarmatian culture. Tens of thousands of artefacts of pottery were excavated and restored by the specialists of the Kossuth Museum, Cegléd, creating a collection of European importance.

== Gallery ==
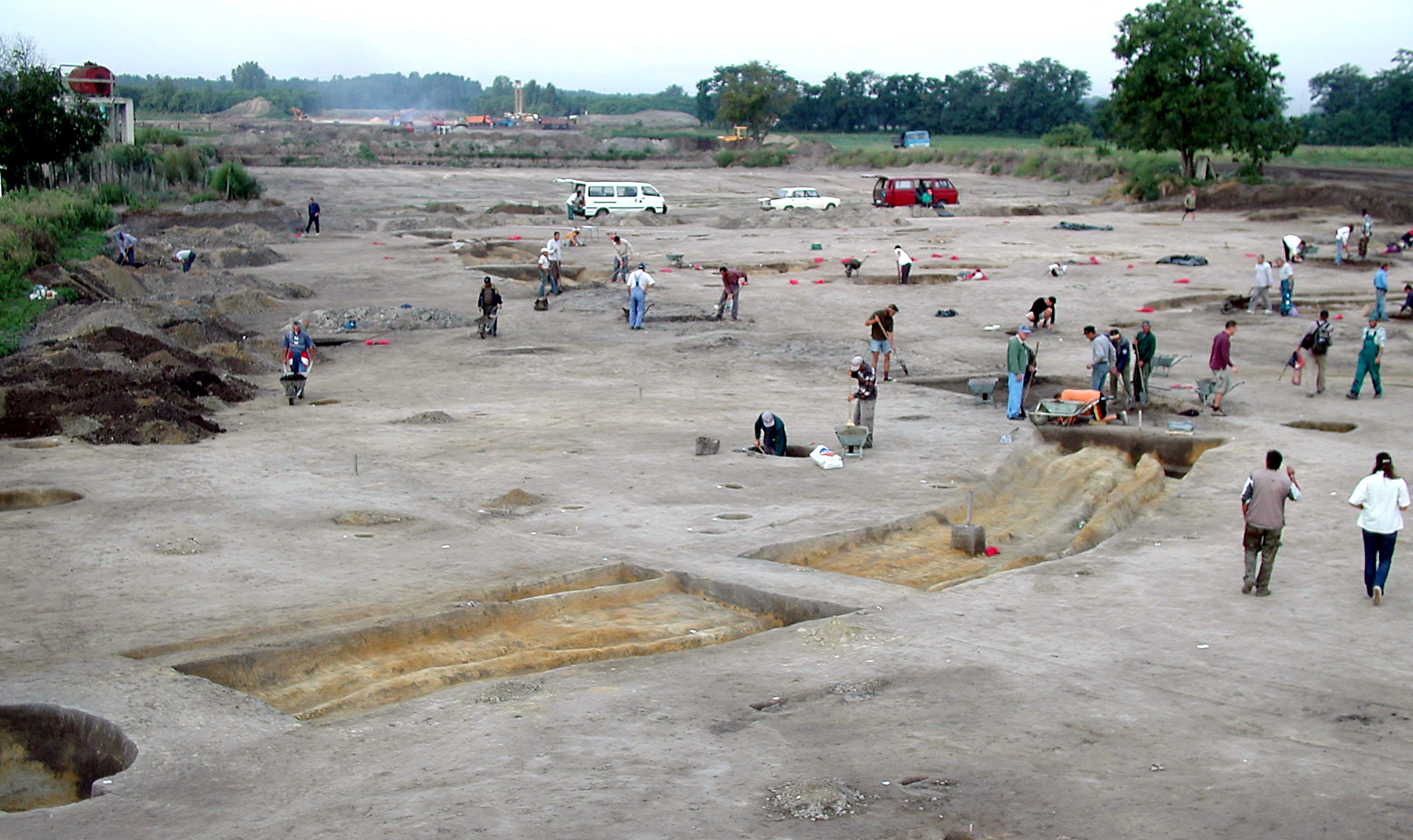
Üllő5 archeological site

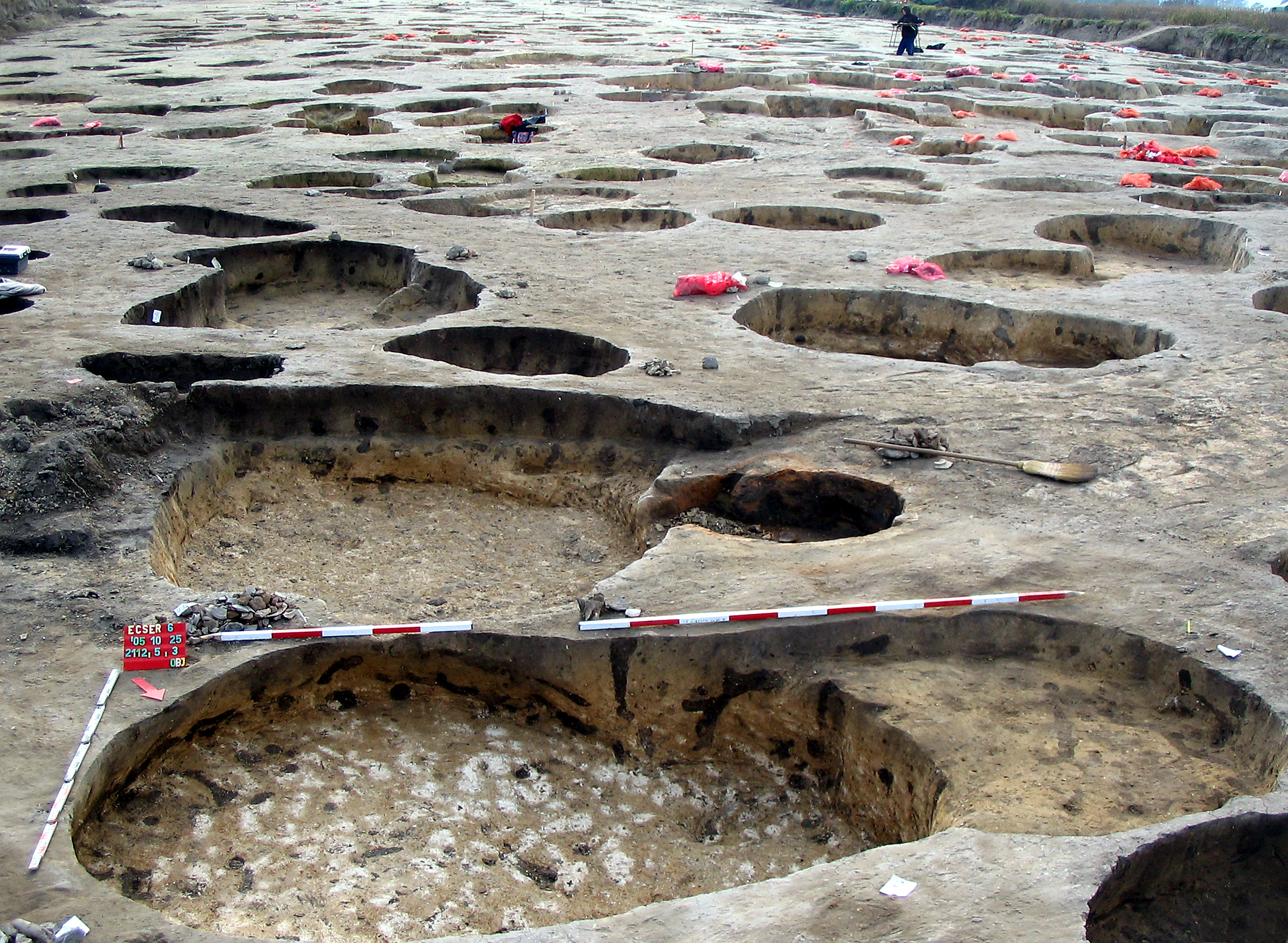
Üllő5 archeological site

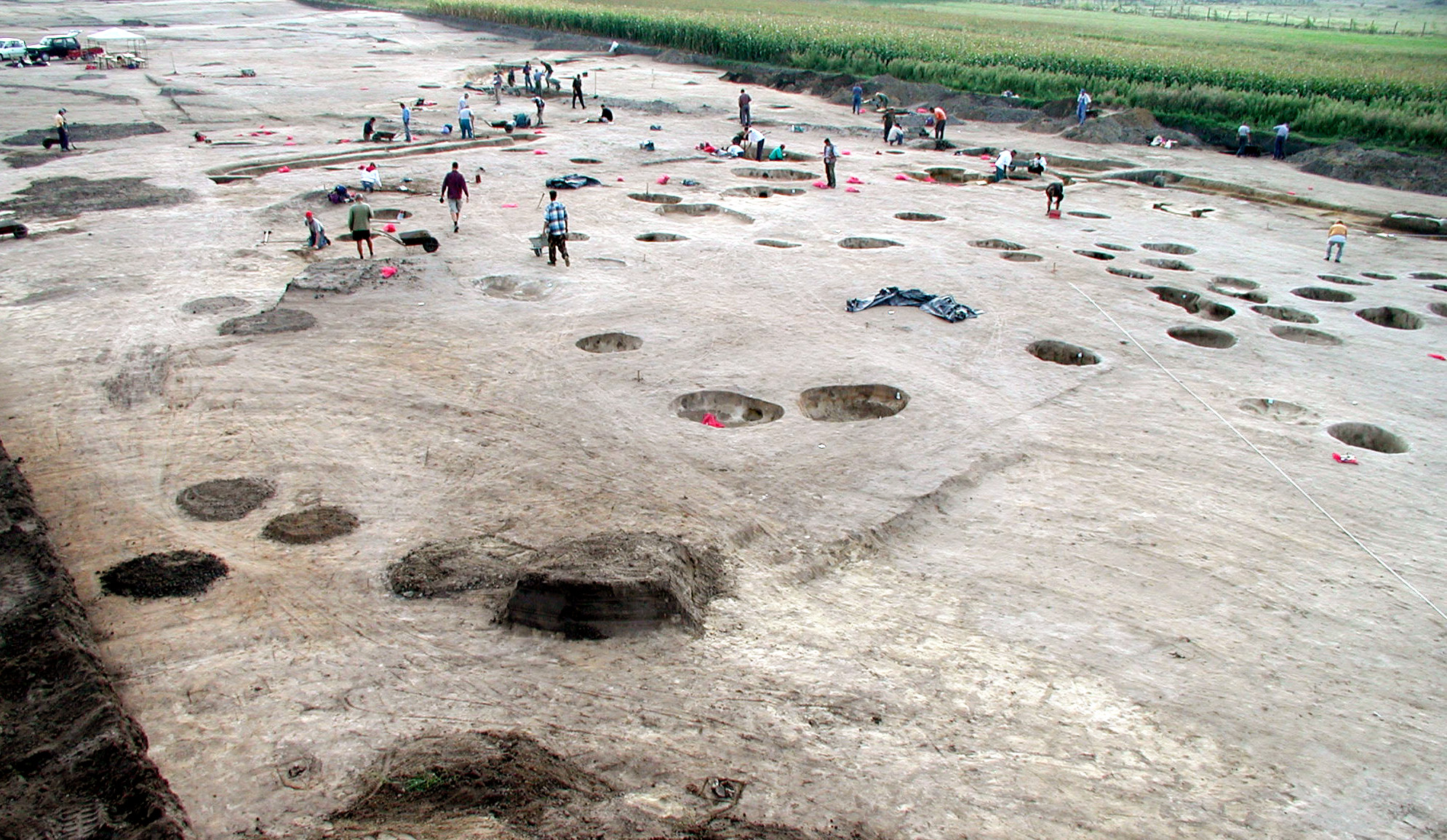
Nearby Vecsés4 site

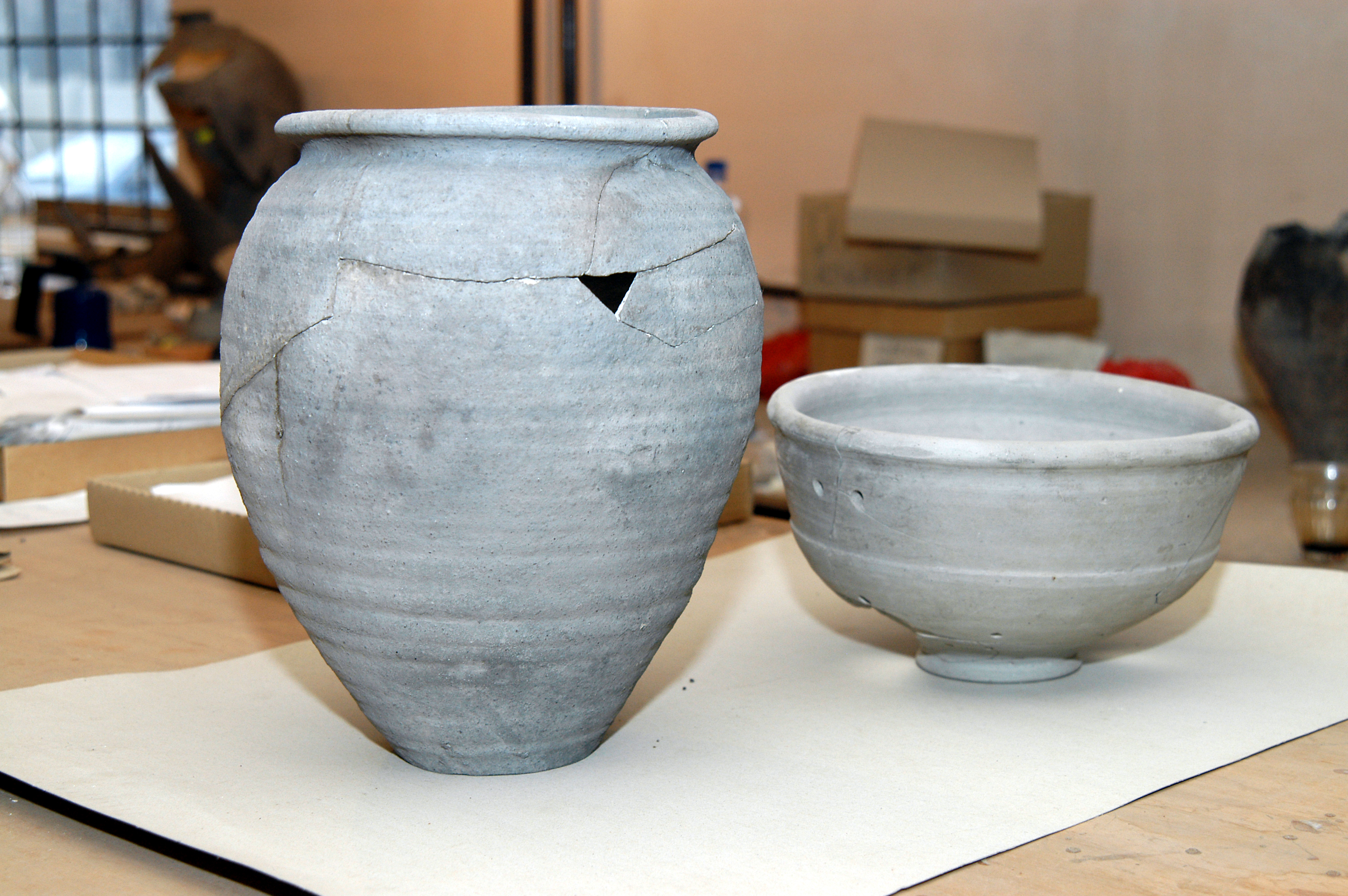
Late Sarmatian pottery from the site

== Sources ==
Only in Hungarian:

- Nyári régészeti csúcsforgalom
- Pest Megyei Közművelődési Intézet - Útépítéseket megelőző régészeti feltárások Pest megyében 2001 – 2006 - Tudományos ülés
- https://www.numismatics.hu/hirarchivum2004_05.htm
