= Zorsines =

- Leader of the Siraces
- Reign: fl. 41-49

Zorsines was a 1st-century King (rex Siracorum) of the Siraces mentioned in Tacitus' Annals of the Roman Empire (XII.15-19) around AD 50, a people he reports as residing somewhere between the Caucasus Mountains and the Don river.

He had a fortification at Uspe.

He fought in the Bosporus under Mithridates III, the former king of the Bosporan Kingdom, against the Dandaridae. His ally Mithridates later turned against and fought the Romans in AD 47–48 who had put him on the throne earlier in 41. Mithridates eluded the Romans and managed to recover his kingdom. The Aorsi under Prince Eunones, sent after Mithridates and his lands by Gaius Julius Aquila and Cotys, later clashed with Zorsines, besieging Uspe in AD 49. (The town offered 10,000 slaves in capitulation, but the Romans declined and so the assault continued.) Zorsines finally decided to leave Mithridates to rule his paternal lands, after giving hostages to the Romans and thus making peace. He acknowledged Roman superiority before the image of Emperor Claudius.

== See also ==
- Serboi

Regnal titles
Preceded by last known Abeacus; 63-47 BC	Leader of the Siraces fl. 41-49	Succeeded by Drvan
