= Gaius Julius Aquila =

Name of a number of people who lived in the Roman Empire

Gaius Julius Aquila was the name of a number of people who lived during the Roman Empire.

== Prefect of Egypt ==
Gaius Julius Aquila was a praefectus of Roman Egypt between 10 CE and 11.

== Governor of Bythinia et Pontus ==
Gaius Julius Aquila was a Roman knight, stationed with a few cohorts, in 45 CE, to protect Tiberius Julius Cotys I, king of the Bosporan Kingdom, who had received the sovereignty after the expulsion of Tiberius Julius Mithridates; the former two won a victory against the latter in a battle on the Don. In the same year, Aquila obtained the praetorian insignia. He also erected a monument honouring the emperor Claudius in Asia Minor (modern Turkey) known as the Kuşkayası Monument.
