= Aorsi =

Ancient Iranian people

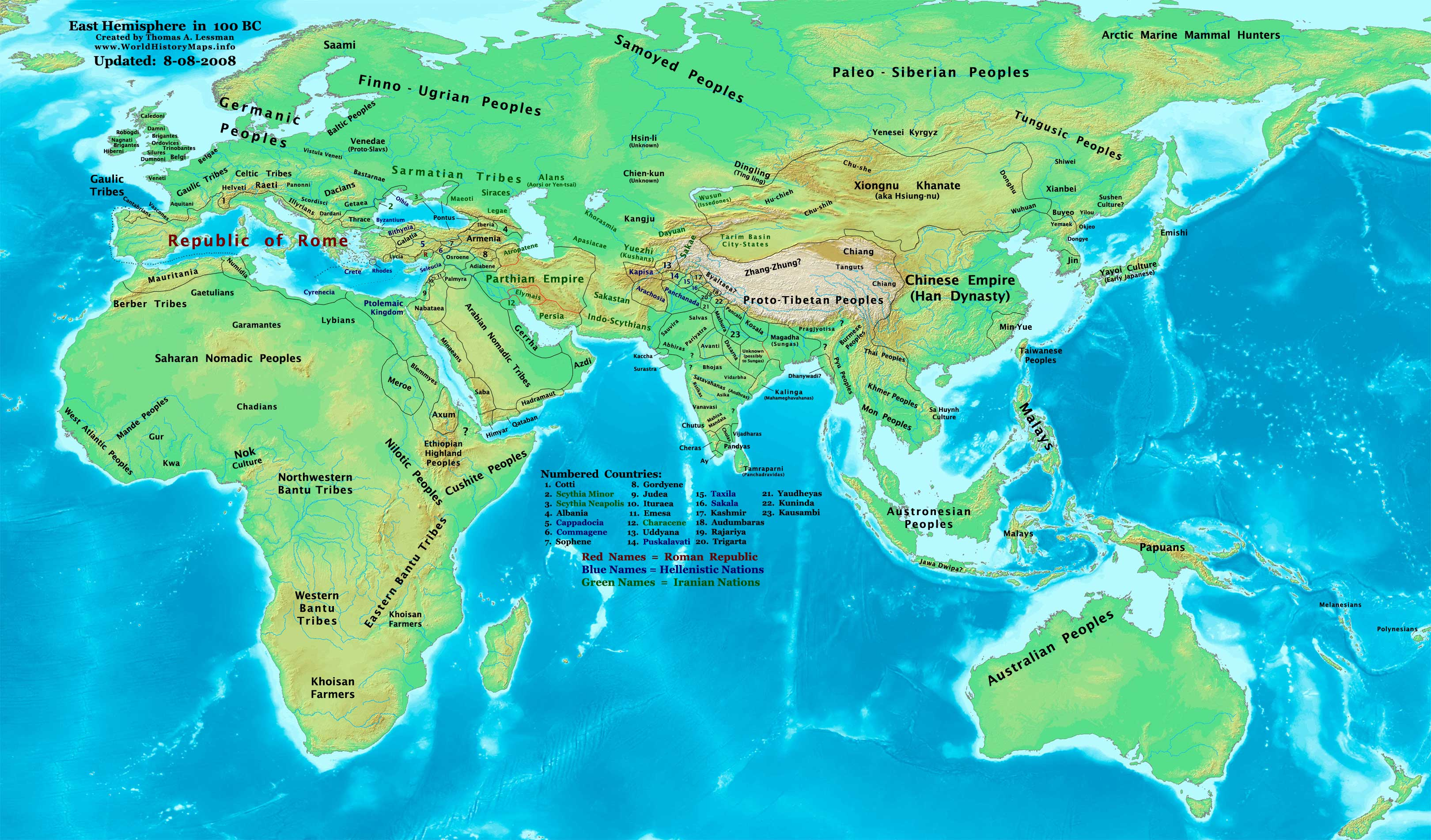
The Eastern Hemisphere in 100 BC. The Alans/Aorsi are located immediately north of the Caspian Sea.

The Aorsi, known in Greek sources as the Aorsoi (Ἄορσοι), were an ancient Iranic people of the Sarmatian group, who played a major role in the events of the Pontic Steppe from the 1st century BC to the 1st century AD.

They are often regarded as connected to the contemporaneous Eurasian steppe state of Yancai (or Yentsai) mentioned in ancient Chinese records. The Alans, first mentioned by Middle Eastern and European scholars in the 1st century AD, are regarded as successors of the Aorsi.

== Name ==
The ethnonym Aorsi is generally linked to the Avestan auruša- and the Ossetic ūrs or ors, meaning 'white'. The names Arsīyah and Arsā, mentioned by Al-Masudi and Al-Garnati in the 10–12th century AD, may also be related.

== History ==
The Aorsi and an associated tribe, the Siraces, are believed to have migrated during the late 5th century BC from Central Asia to areas north and west of the Caspian Sea. The territory of the Aorsi is believed to have extended eastwards as far as the Aral Sea. The most important contemporaneous source on the Aorsi was the Greek geographer Strabo, in Geographica (64/63 BC – c. AD 24). Strabo suggested that the Aorsi were located north-east of the Siraces, who inhabited the area between Lake Maeotis (Sea of Azov) and the Caspian. Furthest to the east lived the Upper Aorsi. They held the largest territory, dominating according to Strabo the Caspian coast, which enabled them to become the most numerous faction. The Upper Aorsi imported Indian and Babylonian merchandise by camel through Armenia and Media, which enabled them to become wealthy. They controlled the northern part of the Silk Route, known as the Northern Route. The Aorsi became famous for their wearing of golden ornaments.

During the reign of Pharnaces II of the Bosporan Kingdom, according to Strabo, king Spadines of the Aorsi along the Tanais could muster a force of 200,000 horsemen, while the Upper Aorsi could muster even more.

In the Annals, Tacitus (c. AD 56 – after 117) writes that in the Bosporan War of 49 AD, the Adorsi [sic] king Eunones supported the Pro-Roman faction of Tiberius Julius Cotys I, while the king Zorsines of the Siraces supported the anti-Roman Tiberius Julius Mithridates. Together with Roman cohorts and Roman-armed Bosporans, the Aorsi besieged the poorly fortified town of the Siraces and massacred its population, forcing their king Zorsines to yield hostages and prostrate himself before the image of Emperor Claudius.

Facing inevitable defeat, Mithridates surrendered and threw himself before the feet of Eunones. Eunones was deeply moved by Mithridates' plight, and sent envoys to Claudius supporting Mithridates' request to be executed without a triumph. Claudius agreed in a letter to Eunones, and although Mithridates was eventually brought to Rome through Pontus, he was spared from execution and instead exiled. After the Bosporan War the Siraces were significantly weakened while the Aorsi rose in strength.

== Links to Yancai and Alans ==
Many scholars have equated both the Aorsi and Alans to the state of Yancai, also known as Alanliao, which was mentioned in earlier Chinese records. The 2nd century BC diplomat Zhang Qian (cited by Sima Qian in Chapter 123 of the Shiji), reported that Yancai lay 2,000 li (832 km) north-west of the state of Kangju, in the Ferghana Valley, with which it shared similar customs. Yancai was centered near the Aral Sea and able to muster 100,000 mounted archers. This location on the Eurasian Steppe was similar to that reported for the Aorsi by sources such as Strabo. A chronicle of the Later Han dynasty, the Hou Hanshu (88) – covering the period 25–220, but not completed until the 5th century, mentioned a report that Yancai had become a vassal state of Kangju, and was now known as Alanliao (Chinese: 阿蘭聊).

Y. A. Zadneprovskiy suggests that the subjugation of Yancai by Kangju occurred in the 1st century BC. The westward expansion of Kangju obliged many of the Aorsi and other Sarmatians to migrate westwards. This migration contributed significantly to the Migration Period in Europe, which played an important role in world history.

In the 1st century AD, the Alans achieved a dominant position among the Sarmatians living between the Don River and the Caspian Sea. The Alans were a people from the east closely related to the Aorsi, whom they either absorbed or conquered. Some of the Aorsi appear to have migrated west to the north of Crimea, where they maintained a semi-independent existence. Ptolemy also speaks of the Alanorsi, suggesting that a fusion of some sorts between them had occurred.

One of the seven Hungarian tribes, Örs, may be related to the Aorsi.

== See also ==
- List of ancient Iranian peoples
- Arsiyah
- Erzya, Aorsi and Arsiyah

== Bibliography ==
=== Primary sources ===
- Tacitus. Annals.
- Strabo. Geographica.

=== Secondary sources ===
- Alemany, Agustí (2000). Sources on the Alans: A Critical Compilation. Brill. ISBN 978-90-04-11442-5.
- Brzezinski, Richard; Mielczarek, Mariusz (2002). The Sarmatians, 600 BC-AD 450. Osprey Publishing. ISBN 184176485X.
- Zadneprovskiy, Y. A. (1 January 1994). "The Nomads of Northern Central Asia After The Invasion of Alexander". In Harmatta, János (ed.). History of Civilizations of Central Asia: The Development of Sedentary and Nomadic Civilizations, 700 B. C. to A. D. 250. UNESCO. pp. 457–472. ISBN 9231028464.
