= Tirgatao's war =

War between a Maeotian coalition and the Bosporan and Sindian kingdoms

- Part of the Bosporan wars of expansion
Date	Early 4th century BC (c. 390s–380s BC)
Location	Sindica and the Asian territories of the Bosporan Kingdom
Result	Negotiated peace; Gorgippus ends the war with supplication and gifts to Tirgatao

Belligerents
Ixomatae and allied Maeotian tribes	Bosporan Kingdom; Sindian kingdom

Commanders and leaders
Tirgatao	Satyrus I Hecataeus; Gorgippus

Tirgatao's war was a conflict of the early 4th century BC between a coalition of Maeotian tribes led by the Ixomatae princess Tirgatao and the allied Bosporan and Sindian kingdoms. The war is known from a single narrative, a "stratagem" of Polyaenus centered on Tirgatao. After the death of Satyrus I, his son Gorgippus ended the war with supplication and gifts to Tirgatao. Among its casualties was Metrodorus, a son of Satyrus, executed while held hostage.

== Prelude ==
The Spartocids had been expanding their dominion over the neighboring cities of Nymphaeum and Cimmericum, and extended their influence over Sindica through its king, Hecataeus. Hecataeus had been expelled from his kingdom and was restored to his throne by Satyrus, who gave him his daughter in marriage and demanded that he kill his current wife, the Maeotian Tirgatao. Unwilling to kill a wife he loved, Hecataeus instead confined her in a fortress, from which she escaped and made her way back to her own people, the Ixomatae.

== War ==
Tirgatao roused the Ixomatae to war and won over many of the warlike tribes around the Maeotis. The coalition first invaded the country of Hecataeus and then ravaged the territories of Satyrus. Unable to defend both fronts, the two kings sued for peace, sending Satyrus' son Metrodorus as a hostage. Satyrus broke the peace, sending two of his friends to Tirgatao's court in the guise of refugees to assassinate her. The attempt failed, and under torture the assassins confessed the plot. Tirgatao executed the hostage and resumed the war, laying waste to Satyrus' lands.

According to Polyaenus, Satyrus died "in despair" in the midst of the renewed war, but a separate tradition, preserved by Harpocration, has him die while besieging Theodosia, and the two accounts are not easily reconciled. Satyrus was succeeded jointly by his sons Leucon and Gorgippus, though Polyaenus, concerned only with the war, mentions Gorgippus alone. Gorgippus then went to Tirgatao himself and, with entreaties and rich gifts, persuaded her to end the war.

== Historicity ==
The tale survives only in Polyaenus, a compiler of the 2nd century AD, and its romance-like features have long raised doubts about its details. The name Tirgatao resembles Targitaos, the first Scythian in Herodotus' origin legend; the name Metrodorus is of a late type; and the story shares motifs with the Greek novel. Most scholars nevertheless accept that the broad outline reflects real events: the extension of Bosporan power over the Sindians under Satyrus and Gorgippus, and a destructive Maeotian war connected with it.

== Aftermath ==
The peace left Hecataeus' Sindian kingdom a dependency of the Bosporan rulers. Within roughly a decade, the Bosporan ruler Leucon I intervened in Sindian affairs again, this time against Hecataeus' son Octamasades, who had risen against his father; Leucon defeated him at the Battle of Labryta around 380 BC, and Sindica was annexed to the Bosporan Kingdom soon afterward.

== Sources ==
- Braund, David (2007). "The Sindians of the Taman Peninsula ca. 400 BC: Polyaenus' Tirgitao, Numismatics and Demosthenes' Grandfather". In Solovyov, S. L. (ed.). Greeks and Natives in the Cimmerian Bosporus, 7th–1st Centuries BC. BAR International Series 1729. Oxford: Archaeopress. pp. 17–21.
- Gardiner-Garden, John R. (1986). "Fourth Century Conceptions of Maiotian Ethnography". Historia: Zeitschrift für Alte Geschichte. 35 (2): 192–225. JSTOR 4435962.
- Tokhtas'ev, Sergei R. (2006). "The Bosporus and Sindike in the Era of Leukon I: New Epigraphic Publications". Ancient Civilizations from Scythia to Siberia. 12 (1–2). Brill: 1–62.
