= Spartocid dynasty =

Hellenized Thracian dynasty that ruled the Kingdom of the Bosporus

- Country: Ancient Crimea, Ancient Thrace
- Founded: 438 BC
- Founder: Spartokos I
- Current head: extinct
- Final ruler: Paerisades V
- Titles: Basileus; Archon of the Bosporus; King of all Maeotians; King of the Cimmerians
- Estates: Ancient Crimea, Thrace

The Spartocids (Greek: Σπαρτοκίδαι) or Spartocidae was the name of a dynasty that ruled the Hellenistic Kingdom of Bosporus between the years 438–108 BC. They had usurped the former dynasty, the Archaeanactids, who were tyrants of Panticapaeum from 480 to 438 BC. The throne of the Bosporan Kingdom was usurped by Spartokos I in 438 BC, after whom the dynasty is named.

Spartokos's descendants would continue to rule the Bosporus until 108 BC, in which it was briefly conquered by the invading Scythians led by Saumacus and subsequently ruled by the Mithridatic and Tiberian-Julian dynasties. The dynasty continued to repeat the names of succeeding princes, with the final Spartokos being named Spartokos V. The dynasty also had intermarriages, notably the marriage of Komosarye and Paerisades I. The most famous known ruler is Leukon I, who expanded the kingdom beyond its boundaries, resisted the Scythians, and ruled for 40 years.

== Ethnicity ==
The ethnic origin of the Spartocid dynasty remains a subject of debate among historians. Because surviving classical sources do not explicitly state the ancestry of Spartokos I, modern scholarship relies on indirect evidence, including anthroponomy (personal names), political institutions, diplomatic relations with neighboring polities, and the broader demographic composition of the Cimmerian Bosporus. Consequently, several competing hypotheses have been advanced, identifying the dynasty as Thracian, Sindo-Maeotian, Scythian, or Greek.

=== Thracian origin ===
The Thracian hypothesis has traditionally been one of the most influential interpretations in classical historiography. Supporters of this view include G. Perrot, G. Gayer, V. F. Gaidukevich, A. V. Mishulin, O. V. Kudryavtsev, G. Werner, and H. Danov. The Thracian thesis stands as one of the two principal competing explanations for the dynasty's origins.

According to proponents of this theory, Spartokos I emerged from a Thracian aristocratic or mercenary milieu and established himself in the Bosporus during the political upheavals of the early 4th century BC. The primary argument in favor of this view is the linguistic character of the dynastic name "Spartokos", which is well attested among the ruling elites of Thrace.

As Vladimir Gaidukevich noted:

"From the point of view of Greek writers, the Spartocids were not Hellenes by origin."

Advocates of this thesis also emphasize structural similarities between the Bosporan monarchy and political developments in Thrace, notably the emergence of hereditary autocracies ruling over ethnically diverse, subject populations. Some historians suggest that Spartokos may have initially arrived in the region as a military commander before consolidating power.

Aytek Namitok writes:

"The Spartocid dynasty was Thracian. The Thracians were not outsiders, but a native people. The Sindi were Thracians. The Spartocids came from among them."

Within this framework, the rise of the dynasty is viewed as an extension of the deep political and cultural connections connecting the Bosporan Kingdom to the wider Thracian world.

=== Sindo-Maeotian origin ===
An alternative interpretation identifies the Spartocids as members of the indigenous Sindo-Maeotian aristocracy native to the Taman Peninsula and the Kuban region. This theory is supported by Frédéric Dubois de Montpéreux, M. I. Rostovtsev, M. I. Artamonov, V. D. Blavatsky, G. A. Tsvetayeva, and I. I. Russu. This indigenous thesis serves as the primary alternative to the Thracian interpretation.

According to this hypothesis, Spartokos I was not a foreign adventurer but a representative of local, Hellenized tribal elites who had become integrated into the political architecture of the Bosporan state. The dynasty's rise is thus interpreted as the political ascendancy of indigenous factions rather than an external usurpation.

Mikhail Artamonov argued:

"The Bosporan kings came not from a Thracian milieu, but from a Cimmero-Sind milieu; the Bosporan rulers and the Sind kings were bound by firm kinship ties; they were members of one family."

Artamonov viewed the Bosporan state as a mixed Greek-indigenous polity in which the native Maeotian populations played a decisive role. He further associated the Maeotians with populations traditionally connected to the Cimmerians, thereby giving the dynasty a deeply rooted regional background.

Mikhail Artamonov also writes:

"The Spartocids were immigrants from Meotian tribes."

Similarly, Michael Rostovtzeff characterized the Bosporan Kingdom as a frontier society where Greek and local elements became intertwined, creating the conditions for a dynasty of local origin to take the throne.

Proponents argue that the dynasty's long-term success in governing both sovereign Greek cities and indigenous tribes is more readily explained if the ruling house possessed organic roots among the Sindi and Maeotians.

=== Scythian origin ===
A smaller number of scholars have proposed a Scythian origin for the ruling house. This interpretation is primarily associated with Sergei Zhebelev and Dmitry Kallistov.

This theory emphasizes the close political, military, and economic symbiosis between the Bosporan Kingdom and the Scythian nomadic elite of the steppe. Throughout Bosporan history, the rulers maintained complex diplomatic alliances, intermarriages, and military pacts with Scythian chieftains, leading these historians to suggest that the dynasty itself may have emerged from a Scythian aristocratic background.

Sergei Zhebelev observed:

"The origins of the dynasty should be sought among the barbarian populations connected with the Bosporan state."

Supporters argue that the dynasty's position as a bridge between sedentary Greek cities and nomadic steppe populations reflects a frontier character that aligns with a Scythian political environment.

However, direct evidence for a specifically Scythian ancestry remains limited, and the theory has generally attracted fewer adherents than the Thracian or Sindo-Maeotian explanations.

=== Greek origin ===
A minority school of thought contends that the Spartocids were of ethnic Greek origin. This position is held by Alexander Sibirsky, Tatiana Blavatskaya, I. B. Brashinsky, Anna Boltunova, and N. K. Sopova.

According to this interpretation, the dynasty emerged from within Bosporan Greek colonial society itself and should be understood primarily within the framework of local Hellenic political developments.

Alexander Sibirsky wrote:

"The rise of the Spartocids represents a continuation of Bosporan Greek political traditions rather than the establishment of a foreign ruling house."

Supporters of the Greek hypothesis point to the dynasty's seamless participation in pan-Hellenic religious cults, its exclusive use of the Greek language in official state epigraphy, its close diplomatic relationships with Athens, and its adherence to Greek civic institutions.

Tatiana Blavatskaya observed:

"The Spartocids functioned within a fundamentally Greek cultural and political environment."

Even so, most historians favoring a Greek origin acknowledge that the Bosporan Kingdom was ethnically diverse and that extensive interaction occurred between Greeks and indigenous populations. Consequently, the dynasty is often viewed as part of a broader frontier society rather than a purely Hellenic political formation.

=== Assessment ===
The historiographical debate surrounding the origins of the Spartocids mirrors broader discussions regarding the cultural identity of the Bosporan Kingdom itself. Throughout the 19th and 20th centuries, scholarship increasingly shifted away from viewing the kingdom as a pure Greek colonial outpost, emphasizing instead its mixed ethnic character as an intermediary zone between the Mediterranean and the Eurasian steppe.

As Yuri Vinogradov summarized:

"The Bosporan Kingdom was a political organism formed through the interaction of Greek and indigenous traditions."

Modern scholarship has not reached a consensus regarding the dynasty's precise ethnic extraction. While the Thracian and Sindo-Maeotian theories remain the most influential and linguistically supported, the surviving evidence is ultimately deemed insufficient to isolate a single ethnic origin with absolute certainty. Instead, the Spartocids are generally viewed as a product of the multicultural frontier environment of the northern Black Sea coast.

== History ==
The Spartocids are thought to be of Thracian origin, and to have connections with the Odrysian dynasty, the rulers of the Thracian Odrysian Kingdom. Spartokos I is often thought to have been a Thracian mercenary who was hired by the Archaeanactids, and that he usurped the Archaeanactids in around 438 BC, becoming "king" of the Bosporan Kingdom, then only a few cities, such as Panticapaeum. Spartokos was succeeded by his son, Satyros I, who would go on to conquer many cities around Panticapaeum such as Nymphaeum and Kimmerikon. Satyros's son, Leukon I, would go to conquer and expand the kingdom beyond boundaries his father ever thought of.

Leukon would also engage in wars against the Ixomatae, Sindoi, and Heracleans. His brother, Gorgippos, would rule from the Asiatic side of the kingdom, specifically in Sindia, the former capital of the Sindike Kingdom, and rename it Gorgippia, probably after himself.

The Spartocid rulers seem have jointly ruled with their sons and brothers. Leukon's sons, Spartokos II and Paerisades I, jointly ruled until Spartokos's death five years into his reign. This can also be seen with Paerisades's own children, Satyros II and Gorgippis II, both of whom co-ruled their father. This same pattern can be seen decades later, with Spartokos IV and Leukon II reign's.

== Wars of expansion ==
The Spartocids were the leading figures of the Bosporan wars of expansion, a series of conflicts and sieges that occurred from 438 BC to around 350 BC, just before the death of Leukon. These wars resulted in the death of Satyros I and Metrodoros and a perhaps the brother of Satyros, Seleukos. Satyros died in the 1st siege of Theodosia in 389 BC] and Metrodoros was killed by Tirgatao as he was her hostage under a treaty she had with Satyros, before he betrayed her. Upon Satyros's death in 389 BC, Leukon engaged in the Battle of Labrytai which was a dynastic dispute between the original king of the Sindoi, Hekataios, and his son Oktamasades ending with a victory for Leukon and the exile of Oktamasades. Sometime after this, Leukon and Gorgippos became rulers of the Sindike Kingdom. Leukon then started 2 sieges of Theodisa, the 2nd in 365 BC, and the 3rd siege of the city in 360 BC, ultimately annexing the city into his dominions after a long with Heraclea Pontica with varying success.

== Further expansion ==
Paerisades I would marry his cousin, Komosarye, a daughter of Gorgippos and through this marriage, he would become king of the Sindians. He would also engage in a war against invading Scythian tribes, due to him refusing to pay them tribute. Paerisades also, at some point during his reign, took the strategic city of Tanais near the Don River and added several other nomadic tribes to his dominions.

== Civil war ==
The Spartocids would engage in a civil war among each other in about 309 BC, after the death of Paerisades I. The dynastic dispute would include Satyros II who was the eldest, and inherited the throne, Prytanis, and Eumelos, who had a claim to the throne. The war was carried into 2 large engagements, starting with the Battle of the River Thatis and later the Siege of Siracena, in which Satyros II lost his life. Eumelos, after defeating his elder brother Satyros, attempted to divide the kingdom with Prytanis, but the latter refused, leading to his eventual defeat near the Maeotic Lake and death at the Eumelos' hands. Under Eumelos's reign, the Bosporan Kingdom enjoyed much military success, purging the Black Sea of nearly all pirates, and was large enough to rival the state of Lysimachus, one of Alexander's powerful generals. Eumelos's son, Spartokos III, was then able to re-establish their trade agreements with Athens and was the first Spartocid ruler to assume the title of "basileus". His son, or nephew, Paerisades II, was unexpectedly active in diplomacy between the kingdoms of the Diadochi, being mentioned as sending ambassadors to Ptolemy II and doing cup offerings with Antigonus II at Delos.

== Decline ==
The Bosporan Kingdom entered into a decline due to numerous attacks from nomadic Scythian tribes in the subsequent centuries leading up to its fall. The last Spartocid rulers, Paerisades III, Kamasarye II Philoteknos, Paerisades IV and Paerisades V were under extreme pressure from Scythian attacks. Paerisades V, the last of his dynasty, offered his kingdom to Mithridates VI in exchange for the protection of his people and of himself. Diophantus, Mithridates's general, barely escaped the rebellion led by Saumacus, a possible Scythian and Paerisades V's adoptive heir. Paerisades V died in Panticapaeum at Saumacus' hands, ending Spartocid rule in the Cimmerian Bosporus.

== Spartocid rulers ==
Spartocid Rulers
King	Reign (BC)	Consort(s)	Comments
Spartokos I	438-433 BC		Usurped former Greek dynasts
Satyros I	433-389 BC		Co-ruled with his father until his father's death.
Seleukos	433-393 BC		Possible brother of Satyros I and co-ruled with him until his death.
Leukon I	389-349 BC	Theodosia	Theodosia may have been daughter of the powerful Bosporan diplomat Sopaios.
Gorgippos I	389-349 BC		Co-ruler with Leukon, ruled from the Asiatic capital, Gorgippia. He was the father of Komosarye.
Spartokos II	349-342		Son of Leukon, Co-ruled with his brother Paerisades I up until his death.
Paerisades I	349-310 BC	Komosarye	Son of Leukon, Co-ruled for 7 years with his brother Spartokos, then ruled alone until his death in 309 BC. Komosarye was his cousin.
Satyros II	310 BC		Eldest son of Paerisades, ruled for only 9 months.
Prytanis	310-309		Son of Paerisades, ruled for a brief period of time.
Eumelos	309-304 BC		Son of Paerisades, Expanded dominions and was a rival of Lysimachus.
Spartokos III	304-284 BC		Son of Eumelos, was recognized by Athens as a "king" of the Bosporan.
Paerisades II	circa. 284-245 BC		Son of Spartokos III
Spartokos IV	circa. 245-240 BC		Son of Paerisades II
Leukon II	circa. 240-220 BC	Alkathoe	Son of Spartokos IV
Hygiainon	circa. 220-200 BC		Spartocid supporter, was Archon until Kamasarye married her cousin Paerisades III
Spartokos V	circa. 200-180 BC		Son of Leukon II
Paerisades III	180-150 BC	Kamasarye Philoteknos	Perhaps son of Spartokos IV
Kamasarye Philoteknos	circa.180-150 BC	Paerisades III; Argotas	Daughter of Spartokos V
Paerisades IV Philometor	circa. 150-125 BC		Eldest son of Paerisades III and Kamasarye.
Paerisades V	125-108 BC		Son of Paerisades III and Argotes. Last Spartocid king of the Bosporan Kingdom.

== Genealogy ==
The following genealogy is based upon Ferdinand Justi, Iranisches Namenbuch, (Marburg, Berlin, 1884), (Heidelsheim, 1963), p. 400:
