= Bosporan wars of expansion =

Wars in the Cimmerian Bosporus (c. 438–355 BCE)

Date	c. 438–355 BC
Location	Cimmerian Bosporus
Result	Bosporan victory

Belligerents
Sindoi; Maeotians; Ixomatae; Dandarioi; Psessoi	Spartocids; Panticapaeum; Scythians; Arcadian Mercenaries	Athens; Nymphaeum; Kimmerikon	Heraclea Pontica; Theodosia; Chersonesus

Commanders and leaders
Tirgatao; Octamasades (surrendered)	Spartokos I †; Satyros I †; Selekuos †; Leukon I Gorgippos; Hekataios; Metrodos †; Sopaios	Gylon of Cerameis (surrendered)	Clearchus; Tynnichus; Memnon

The Bosporan Kingdom waged a series of wars of expansion in the Cimmerian Bosporus and the surrounding territories from around 438 BC until about 355 BC. Bosporan expansion began after Spartokos I, the first Spartocid (and after whom the dynasty is named) took power and during his seven-year reign, established an aggressive expansionist foreign policy that was followed by his successors.

== Background ==
It is possible that Spartokos I was a Thracian mercenary who usurped the Archaeanactids, a Greek dynasty of Bosporan rulers who had ruled for 40 years. Although disputed, some sources say that Spartokos may have been related to the Odrysian royal dynasty as some members included the names of "Sparatokos" and may have sought influence in other parts of the Black Sea. Spartokos I only reigned for 7 years, leaving his son, Satyrus I to carry on his expansionist policies. Satyrus became involved with the neighbouring Sindike Kingdom, and was interested in bringing Nymphaeum under his kingdom's control as well.

== Encounter with Gylon ==
Gylon, the maternal grandfather of Demosthenes, was an Athenian official in charge of the Athenian garrison at Nymphaeum, which was a city that was possibly part of the Delian League. Satyros bribed Gylon so that he surrendered the city of Nymphaeum to Satyros. This resulted in Gylon being exiled, as he was regarded as a traitor by the Athenians. Gylon had received "The Gardens" from Satyros as part of their deal. Around this time, Phanagoria lost its independence.

Gylon married a Scythian noble woman. Their daughter, Kleoboule, would go on to become the mother of Demosthenes. Kimmerikon also seems to have fallen into Bosporan influence shortly during or after the taking of Nymphaeum.

== Conflict with Tirgatao ==
Satyros delved into Sindian affairs, offering his daughter to marry Hekataios, the king of the Sindians. Satyros told him to kill his existing wife, Tirgatao, but instead, Hekataios sent her to a tower and imprisoned her there. Tirgatao managed to escape to her home tribe, the Ixomatae, and married her father's successor and rallied many tribes to her aid and ravaged the lands of Satyros. Satyros sued for peace, offering one of his sons, Metrodoros, as a hostage. Tirgatao agreed and ended her war against Satyros, only to be subject to an assassination attempt organized by Satyros. Upon learning of this, Tirgatao killed her hostage, Metrodoros, and began another war against Satyros.

== First Siege of Theodosia ==
At the same time as he was trying to gain influence with the Sindoi, Satyros had laid siege to Theodosia, a city that was a commercial rival to Panticapaeum due its ice-free ports and a possible ally of Heraclea Pontica. Satyros lost his life at Theodosia while laying siege to the city in 389 BC. He was succeeded by his sons, Leukon and Gorgippos.

== Peace with Tirgatao ==
Upon the death of their father, Leukon and Gorgippos ascended to the Bosporan throne with Gorgippos suing for peace with Tirgatao, who demanded a great tribute from them in exchange for peace. After that, Gorgippos and Leukon focused on their on-going war with Theodosia and Heraclea Pontica and further expansion to the west and south of Panticapaeum.

== Second Siege of Theodosia ==
Leukon laid siege to Theodosia around 365 BC, hoping to annex it to his dominions. During the siege, Tynnichus, a Heracleote commander, had been sent from Heraclea Pontica with a small force including a merchant ship and a trireme, successfully defeated the Bosporans as he managed to destroy their siege weapons during the night and thus succeeded in relieving Theodosia from the siege.

== Putting down the insurrection ==
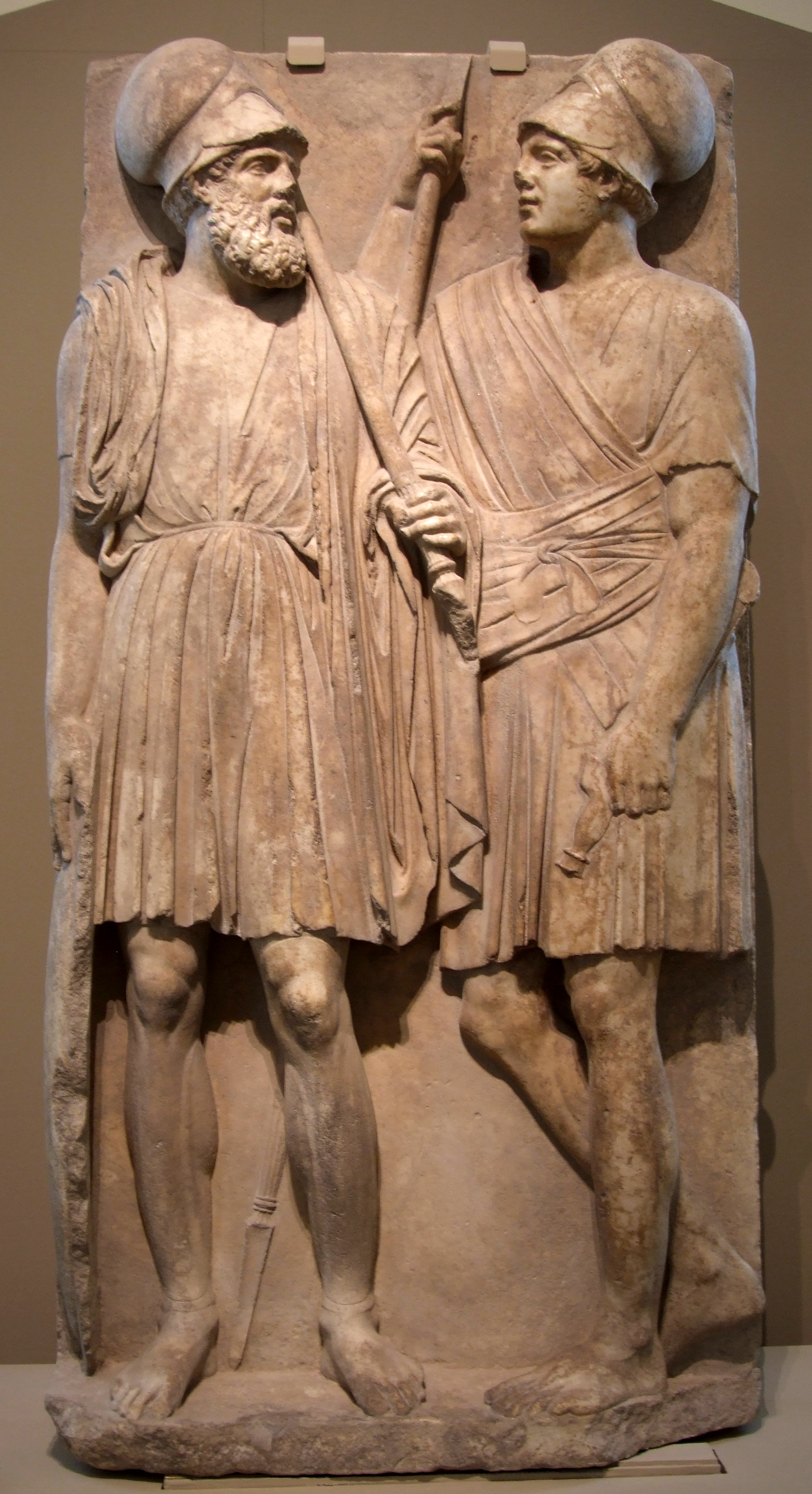
Stele with two soldiers of the Bosporan Kingdom wearing chitons and Corinthian helmets, from the Taman Peninsula (Yubileynoe), southern Russia, 3rd quarter of the 4th century BC; marble, Pushkin Museum

After his father's defeat at Theodosia, as well as his own, Leukon's subjects were not pleased with their king. Leukon suspected that there would be an attempt to remove him from the throne, and rallied the merchants to his aid and borrowed whatever money he could from them. He argued that if his throne was lost, the merchants would not be able to get their money. The merchants then armed themselves and some acted as his bodyguards while others protected the palace. With the help of the merchants, he killed the conspirators. He repaid the merchants as soon as he could.

== Third Siege of Theodosia ==
After putting down a conspiracy against his throne, in around 360 BC, some time after his unsuccessful first attempt at subjugating the city of Theodosia, Leukon laid siege to Theodosia once more when the Heracleotes had recently left, possibly due to Clearchus of Heraclea making himself tyrant of Heraclea and a change of power from an oligarchy to a tyranny. Leukon attacked the city at night and succeeded in defeating and annexing the city, finally putting an end to the war that took his father's life.

Leukon had later provoked the wrath of Heraclea Pontica with his victory at Theodosia, making them wage an all out war against Leukon. They succeeded in defeating the Bosporan fleet, and soon landed on Bosporan territory. Leukon quickly went out to meet them, preparing to protect his kingdom. Leukon was concerned that some of his men might flee the battle, so he placed his Scythian allies to the rear with specific orders to strike down any men who sought to flee. With this tactic, he was able to defeat the Heraclean army.

== War with the Sindike Kingdom ==
The Sindike Kingdom was in the midst of a civil war, as Oktamasades, the son of Hekataios, had taken the throne for himself. Oktamasades had attacked the city of Labrys. Leukon, aiming to annex it into the Bosporan Kingdom, waged war against Oktamasades and quickly defeated him in the Battle of Labrytai, ultimately driving him out into Scythia. Before the battle, Leukon is reported that he “made a vow to erect a victory monument, but not to the local Apollo of Labrys, but to the supreme deity and patron of all the Bosporans", Apollo the Healer. Leukon succeeded in convincing Hekakatios to renounce his kingship, or perhaps he died while Leukon was fighting Okatamsades. Leukon immediately became ruler of the land.

Gorgippos renamed the capital "Sindia" to Gorgippia and Gorgippos established himself as the dynast of the Spartocids on the Asiatic side of the Bosporan Kingdom.

== Conflict with Memnon of Rhodes ==
During the last years of Leukon's reign, Memnon of Rhodes was hired by the city of Heraclea Pontica to wage war on Leukon. He sent ambassadors and envoys to Leukon as if he were wanting an alliance, but in reality, he sent them there to look at Leukon's army. Upon learning about Leukon's forces, Memnon waged war on Leukon and landed on Bosporan soil. He led his army to a field where he was met by a Bosporan army. Memnon retreated to a nearby hill and hid some of his troops, to make it look like that there was discord in his army. Memnon also sent a "deserter" to the Bosporan camp, to tell them that there was a mutiny in the army. When the Bosporans heard of this, they marched to Memnon's army but were quickly defeated, as Memnon's army was not facing any mutiny.

== Later campaigns and aftermath ==
Later on Leukon may have conquered several other tribes, such as that of the Dandarioi, Toretai, and the Psessoi. These tribes were a part of his dominions as they were mentioned as parts of his lands in his title. His son Paerisades I expanded the kingdom even further; at some point during his reign taking Tanais, but the exact date of Tanais being conquered is not known. Through his marriage to his paternal cousin, Komosarye, a daughter of Gorgippos, Paerisades achieved the title "King of the Sindians". Paerisades was also regarded as "divine" by his people, a position none of his predecessors held.

Satyros, Leukon, and Gorgippos had established a dynasty that would rule the Bosporan Kingdom for three centuries, and would enjoy relative peace until 310 BC, when Paerisades I died. Paerisades's sons began the Bosporan Civil War in which the kingdom was divided. The victor of this war, Eumelos, would later increase the power of the kingdom to the point of being able to rival the powerful state created by Lysimachus, one of Alexander's generals.
