= Sindica =

Ancient region and kingdom on the northeastern Black Sea coast

- Unknown (attested 5th century BC)–c. 380 BC
- Common languages: Sindian (affiliation disputed); Ancient Greek
- Government: Monarchy
- History
  - Established: Unknown (attested 5th century BC)
  - Annexed by the Bosporan Kingdom: c. 380 BC
Succeeded by
Bosporan Kingdom
- Today part of: Russia

Sindica or Sindike (Adyghe: Синдикъе, romanized: sindike; Ancient Greek: Σινδική, romanized: Sindikḗ) The ancestors of the Circassians,was a region and kingdom of the Sindi on the Taman Peninsula and the adjacent Black Sea coast of the northwestern Caucasus. Its population combined an indigenous Maeotian majority, a Sindian ruling class, and Greek colonists, and it became the most heavily Hellenized native country of the northern Black Sea coast. By around 400 BC, Sindica was a kingdom dependent on the Bosporan rulers; it was annexed by the Bosporan Kingdom under Leucon I, probably around 380 BC, and its chief town, the Sindian Harbor, was renamed Gorgippia. Sindica remained a distinct administrative district of the Bosporan state into the Roman period.

== Geography and extent ==
Herodotus (completed c. 426 BC) treats Sindica as a region rather than a city, essentially the Taman Peninsula itself: its people are framed as the counterpart of the Scythians of the eastern Crimea, who crossed the frozen Cimmerian Bosporus on the ice to attack them (Herodotus 4.28), and he reckons the widest crossing of the Black Sea from Sindica to Themiscyra on the Thermodon (Herodotus 4.86).

The 4th-century BC Periplus of Pseudo-Scylax (c. 340–330 BC) lists the Sindi and the Greek cities in their territory:

Sindoi. And after Maiotai, the Sindoi nation: for these extend also to the outside of the lake: and there are the following Hellenic cities in them: Phanagoras's city; Kepoi [Gardens]; Sindikos, a harbour; Patous.

Strabo defines Sindica more narrowly as the coastal region of the Taman south of the Hypanis (Kuban), and mentions its royal seat:

"In the Sindian region there is a place called Gorgippia, the royal capital of the Sindi, not far from the sea, and also Aboraka." (Strabo 11.2.10)

Strabo's notice cannot describe the period of Sindian independence directly. The town received the name Gorgippia only in the first half of the 4th century BC, after the Bosporan annexation, and the "royal" residence Strabo mentions is presumably that of the Bosporan rulers, serving also as the seat of their governor of Sindica.

The southern extent of Sindica is debated. Most accounts confine it to the Taman Peninsula and the plains toward the Kuban, but burials in the Sukko valley and the cemeteries near Rassvet (over 200 graves of the 6th and 5th centuries BC) have been taken to show that Sindian territory reached the foothills of the northwestern Caucasus on the Abrau peninsula, toward Tsemesskaya Bay.

== Population and society ==
The indigenous inhabitants of Sindica were Maeotians, settled farmers and fishers who lived in earthworks and open settlements on the Taman and along the middle Kuban. Above them stood the Sindi, a people of probably Scythian origin who imposed themselves on the natives as a ruling class; their ethnic and linguistic affiliation is disputed. Greek colonists formed a third element: from the 6th century BC Greek cities were founded on the southern and western coasts of the peninsula, among them Phanagoria and Hermonassa, which later became part of the Bosporan Kingdom.

The gap between rulers and ruled is visible archaeologically. The Sindian elite were buried in richly furnished kurgans, while the Maeotian population used poorly equipped flat cemeteries. The Sindi belonged archaeologically to the Scythian culture. In the second half of the 5th century BC, the Scythians of the Kuban lost ground to the advancing Sarmatian Siraces, and by 400 BC Scythian culture in the region survived only in Sindica, where the ruling class had adopted it. The Greek cities of the Bosporus became centers of production for steppe customers and brought about a marked Hellenization "not only of the Sindian princes, but also of their subjects of lesser rank".

== The kingdom ==
=== Kingship ===
The Sindi had a monarchical form of government (Polyaenus 8.55); Strabo names Hermonassa, Gorgippia and Aborake among the towns of Sindica (11.2.10). Where the independent kings resided is not directly attested: Strabo's description of Gorgippia as the royal seat of the Sindi uses a name the town acquired only after the Bosporan annexation, and probably reflects the later, Bosporan-era arrangement (see below).

Polyaenus preserves a tale taking place in the early 4th century BC which centered on a Sindian king Hecataeus (a Greek name, itself a sign of Sindian Hellenization) and his Maeotian wife Tirgitao (see below). A Greek verse dedication of the early 4th century BC found at the Semibratnee hillfort (the ancient town of Labryta or Labrys, c. 35 km north of Gorgippia) shows the same Hecataeus as "king of the Sindoi" and names his son Octamasades (Oktamasades), who attempted to depose his father and was driven out of the land of the Sindi "through battle and force" by the Bosporan ruler Leucon I (SEG 48 1027). Royal power may have been limited by a tribal aristocracy. Polyaenus records that Hecataeus was at one point driven from his throne, but does not say by whom; Tokhtas'ev attributes the expulsion to this aristocracy, judges that Octamasades' later rebellion "would hardly have been possible without active support from some section" of it, and reads the ΣΙΝΔΩΝ coinage (below) as struck in its name.

The chronology of these reigns can be fixed only approximately. Hecataeus flourished around 400 BC: he was restored to his throne by Satyrus I of Bosporus (reigned c. 433–389 BC), and he was still king when Leucon I intervened against Octamasades early in his own reign, shortly before the annexation of Sindica in the 380s BC. Octamasades is known only from his failed coup. When the kingdom formed is not known. A Sindian monarchy is directly attested only from around 400 BC. Tokhtas'ev takes the 5th-century coinage to imply kings before Hecataeus, but on the mainstream reading of the coins as a civic issue of the Sindian Harbor (the later Gorgippia), they provide no evidence of an earlier royal line.

=== Coinage ===
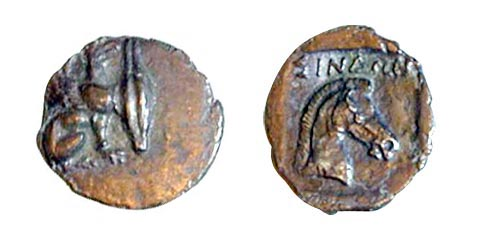
A coin of the Sindi in the Cimmerian Bosporus region. 5th century BC.

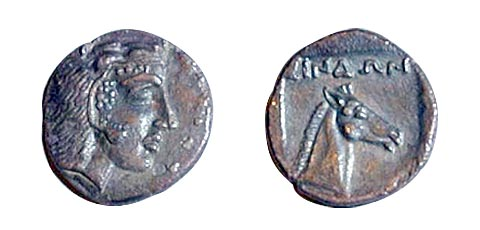
State of Sindica, silver coin. Diobol. 5th century BC.

A short-lived series of silver coins bearing the legend ΣΙΝΔΩΝ ("of the Sindians") was struck in the later 5th century BC, and is found predominantly on the Taman Peninsula. On the mainstream view, the issuing authority was not the Sindian tribe itself but the Greek town of the Sindian Harbor (the later Gorgippia), which struck the coins with a regional legend on behalf of the local Sindi: "it is usually believed", the editors of the Inventory of Archaic and Classical Poleis write, "that the issuing authority in this case was not the Sindian tribe, but the polis Gorgippia". Other interpretations have been proposed: Yu. S. Krushkol took the coins as the coinage of an independent Sindian kingdom, and A. A. Zavoikin and F. V. Boldyrev as an "alliance" issue of the Greek cities of the Taman united against Spartocid expansion, while David Braund suggests an emergency issue minted to pay troops during the warfare that accompanied the extension of Bosporan power. Against the majority view, Tokhtas'ev argues on philological grounds that the legend can only mean that the coins were struck in the name of the Sindian people, in practice the tribal aristocracy that limited the power of the Sindian kings. The dating is also debated: c. 440–400 BC in the standard account, 438/7–425 BC according to V. F. Stolba, while N. A. Frolova has argued for issues beginning in the first half of the 5th century. The denomination is presumably a lightweight diobol on the reduced Aeginetan standard.

Isolated specimens have been found on the Taman Peninsula (Hermonassa) and on the coast of Taman Bay; the most recent find, a silver coin with the head of Heracles, came from excavations at Myrmekion in a layer of the final quarter of the 5th century BC, consistent with the numismatic dating of all three series to the last quarter of the 5th century, perhaps extending into the first years of the 4th.

== Wars with the Bosporan Kingdom and annexation ==
=== Tirgitao's war ===
The only extended narrative of internal Sindian history is a "stratagem" of Polyaenus (2nd century AD). The story has a novelistic coloring, and its details cannot be taken at face value, but most scholars think it preserves, in romance form, the events behind the extension of Bosporan power over the Sindi around 400 BC. In the tale, the Sindian king Hecataeus, expelled from his throne, was restored by Satyrus I, married Satyrus' daughter, and was required to do away with his Maeotian wife Tirgitao. Tirgitao escaped to her people, the Ixomatae, and roused the Maeotians to a destructive war against the Sindians and Bosporans; a peace was sealed with Satyrus' son as hostage, broken by a failed assassination attempt, after which Tirgitao resumed the war. Satyrus died "in despair", and his son Gorgippus ended the war by supplication and gifts. Braund concludes that, whatever the tale's embellishments, it reflects "the development of Bosporan rule over the Sindians under Satyrus and his son Gorgippus", within Satyrus' historical reign (c. 433–389 BC).

A destruction layer of around 400 BC has been identified at the site of the later Gorgippia (the Sindian Harbor). Braund places the sudden appearance and cessation of the ΣΙΝΔΩΝ coinage (above) in the same period of warfare.

=== Annexation under Leucon I ===
Sindica was annexed during the reign of Leucon I (389/8–349/8 BC), and the occasion was a dynastic crisis among the Sindi. Hecataeus' position had long been weak: he had once been driven from his throne, and his restoration by Satyrus, together with the repudiation of Tirgitao that Satyrus demanded, left him little more than a client of the Bosporan rulers. Octamasades' bid for his father's throne was probably backed by part of the Sindian aristocracy, without whose support, in Tokhtas'ev's judgment, the rebellion would hardly have been possible. In the Semibratnee epigram (SEG 48 1027), Leucon, styled only "archon of Bosporus and Theodosia", comes to the defense of his vassal: Octamasades had attacked Labrytae, and Leucon routed his forces at the Battle of Labryta and expelled him from the land of the Sindi. Nothing more is known of Octamasades after his expulsion.

Sergei Tokhtas'ev, the epigram's editor, argues that Leucon, who was probably already seeking a way to take permanent control of Sindica, used the intervention as the occasion for annexation de iure. Dynastic ties eased the transfer: Satyrus had married Hecataeus to his daughter (Leucon's sister), and Leucon's brother Gorgippus had close ties to the Sindian dynasty, which would explain the barbarian name of Gorgippus' daughter Comosarye.

The stages of incorporation are recorded in Leucon's changing titles. A dedication by Theopropides, son of Megakles, from Nymphaion styles Leucon "archon of the Bosporus, Theodosia, the whole of Sindike, the Toretai, Dandarioi and Psessoi". In this inscription, both the Greek cities and the newly annexed peoples appear under the archon title. On Tokhtas'ev's reading, Sindica entered the Bosporan state by treaty; the native monarchy was dissolved and power was shared between Leucon and the Sindian aristocracy. In CIRB 6a the lesser tribes have been transferred to a royal title ("king of the Toretae, Dandarii, Psessi") while Sindica alone remains under the archonship; finally, in the standard formula of CIRB 6, 8, 1037 and 1038, Leucon is "archon of Bosporus and Theodosia, king of the Sindi, Toretae, Dandarii and Psessi", with the Sindi heading the list of subject peoples. The incorporation of Sindica is usually dated to the late 380s BC.

Some accounts describe the incorporation of the Sindi as achieved "peacefully", through the prior establishment of Bosporan trading stations (emporia) in native settlements. An annexation by treaty is compatible with both this tradition and the fighting recorded in the Semibratnee epigram.

== Under Bosporan rule ==
The principal town of Sindica stood on the site of modern Anapa. The earliest settlement there, Sinda, gave its name to the harbor town; in the 6th century BC Greeks from the neighboring Black Sea cities established a colony and trading center on the site, known as the Sindian Harbor (Sindikos Limen, also called Sindike).

After the annexation, Leucon I appointed his brother Gorgippus as his governor (viceroy) in Sindica. Additionally, he seems to have renamed the Sindian Harbor, the capital of the Sindian kingdom, to Gorgippia, after himself. Tokhtas'ev suggests that Hecataeus' former kingdom may at first have been divided between Leucon and Gorgippus, with Gorgippus receiving the district around the Sindian Harbor. On this view, the town was renamed in his honor most probably after his death, and the title "archon of all Sindike" marks the reunification of the country under Leucon. Sindica remained a distinct administrative district of the Bosporan state, separate from the Asiatic "Bosporus" proper, into the Roman period, when officials titled "the one over Gorgippia" (ὁ ἐπὶ τῆς Γοργιππείας) are attested.

Under Bosporan rule the Sindi retained their identity as a named subject people: they head the list of native peoples in the royal titulature down to Paerisades I, under whom the style expands to "king of the Sindi and all the Maeotae" and the Bosporan kingdom extended from the Crimean mountains to the Caucasus. A funerary inscription of the 5th century BC from Gorgippia already attests a settled Greek population in Sindica, and the burials of the Sindian elite show a mixed Greco-barbarian culture.

== Settlements ==
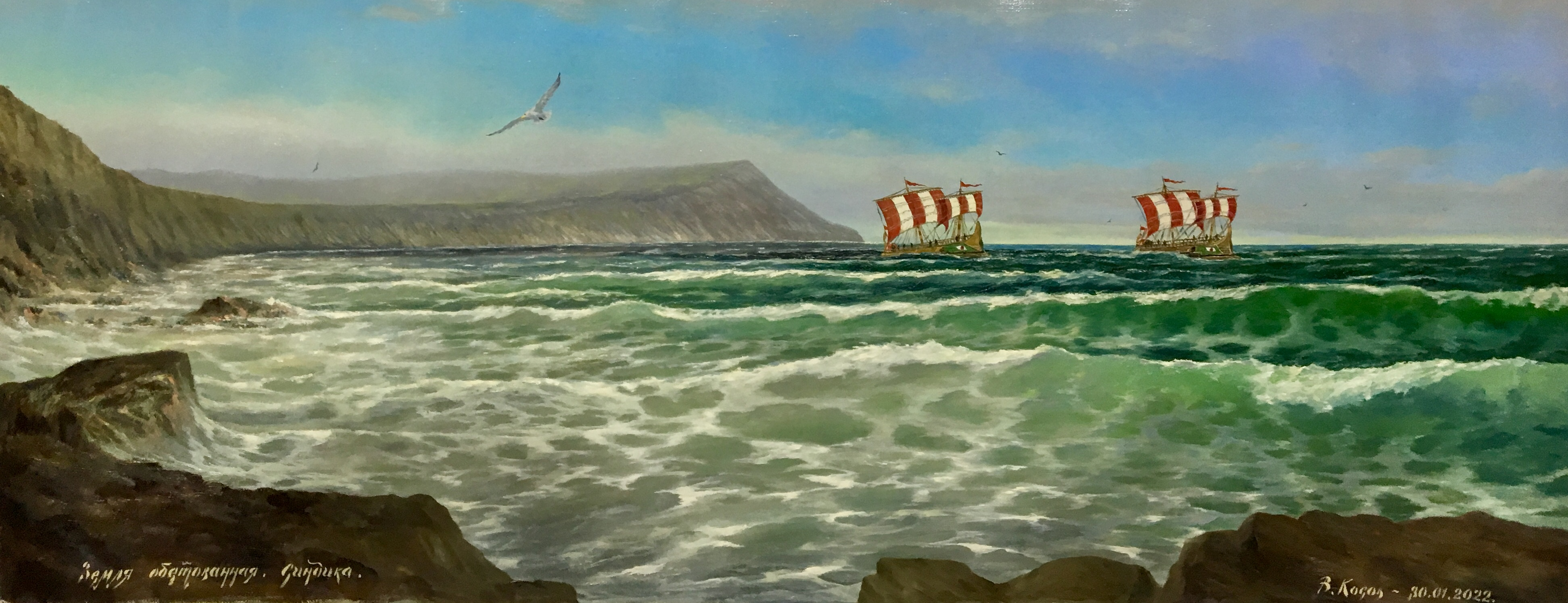
"Sindika, The Promised Land", by Vladimir Kosov. Displayed in Anapa Art Museum.

Certain Sindian settlements are known archaeologically, such as the Semibratnee hillfort (probably ancient Labrytae) near the Kuban River, and the Rayevskoye hillfort near Anapa. The Greek cities located in or besides Sindica included the Sindian Harbor, Phanagoria, Kepoi and Hermonassa.
