= Nymphaion =

Nymphaion (Greek: Νυμφαῖον or Νύμφαιον) can refer to:

== Antiquity ==
- Nymphaeum, a type of monument in Antiquity
- Nymphaeum, the name of Aristotle's Macedonian school at Mieza
- Nymphaeum (Olympia), the name of a structure for distributing water from an aqueduct to the entire site of ancient Olympia
- Nymphaion (fire sanctuary), the name given to the sanctuary of the eternal fire in Illyria
- Nymphaion (cave), a cave where worshipers of Pan went.

== Places ==
- Nymphaeum, alternate name of Daphne Mainomene, an ancient town on the Bosphorus
- Nymphaeum (Bithynia), a town on the Black Sea coast of ancient Bithynia
- Nymphaeum (Caria), an inland town of ancient Caria
- Nymphaeum (Cilicia), a town on the Mediterranean coast of ancient Cilicia
- Nymphaeum (Illyria), an ancient Greek colony in Illyria
- Nymphaion (Crimea), an ancient Greek colony in the Crimea
- Nymphaion (Ionia), an ancient Greek colony in western Anatolia
- Nymphaeum (Laconia), an ancient Greek town in Laconia
- Nymfaio, a village in Florina regional unit, Greece
