= Battle of Labryta =

Battle of the 380s BC in Sindica

- Part of the Bosporan annexation of Sindica
Date	c. 380 BC
Location	Labryta, Sindica; probably the Semibratnee hillfort near the Kuban River
Result	Bosporan victory: Octamasades expelled from Sindica; Sindica annexed by the Bosporan Kingdom soon afterward

Belligerents
Sindian rebels under Octamasades	Bosporan Kingdom

Commanders and leaders
Octamasades	Leucon I

The Battle of Labryta was fought around 380 BC at the town of Labryta (also rendered Labrys) in Sindica, between the Bosporan ruler Leucon I and Octamasades, son of the Sindian king Hecataeus. Octamasades had risen against his father and attacked Labryta; Leucon intervened in defense of Hecataeus, his vassal, routed Octamasades, and drove him out of the land of the Sindi. The battle is known from a single source, the verse dedication Leucon erected at Labryta after his victory, and it was followed soon afterward by the annexation of Sindica to the Bosporan Kingdom.

== Background ==
Sindica, the country of the Sindi on the Taman Peninsula and the adjacent coast, had come under Bosporan influence in the reign of Satyrus I (c. 433–389 BC). According to Polyaenus, the Sindian king Hecataeus was driven from his throne and restored by Satyrus, who married him to his daughter and required him to do away with his Maeotian wife Tirgitao; her escape set off a destructive war by the Maeotian tribes against the Sindians and Bosporans, ended only under Satyrus' son Gorgippus by supplication and gifts. These events left Hecataeus dependent on Bosporan support, and his royal power was by now little more than nominal.

Octamasades' rising against his father may have had backing from part of the Sindian tribal aristocracy, which is sometimes thought to have been behind Hecataeus' earlier expulsion as well. Whether Octamasades actually seized the throne or only attempted to is uncertain.

== Battle ==
The dedication records that Octamasades, casting his father out of power, attacked the city of Labryta, a town in Sindian territory about 35 km north of the later Gorgippia, whose patron god was Apollo. Leucon, styled in the inscription only "[archon of Bosporus] and Theodosia", marched to the defense of his vassal. Before the battle he vowed a dedication to Phoebus Apollo; he then drove Octamasades out of the land of the Sindi "by battle and by force". Nothing further is known of Octamasades.

== Aftermath ==
In fulfillment of his vow, Leucon set up a statue at Labryta to Phoebus Apollo, "guardian of this city, Labryta", the local god of the town he had recovered, carrying the verse inscription that records the battle. The fate of Hecataeus is not recorded; he may have been restored once more, but only briefly, and how power over Sindica passed to Leucon is unknown.

Leucon appears to have used the intervention as the occasion for annexation de iure. In a dedication from Nymphaion made shortly afterward, Leucon bears the new title "archon of the Bosporus, Theodosia, the whole of Sindike, the Toretai, Dandarioi and Psessoi", marking the incorporation of the country into the Bosporan state; in later inscriptions he is "king of the Sindi".

== The inscription ==
The battle is attested only by the epigram on the statue base from Semibratnee (SEG 48:1027), first published by T. V. Blavatskaya in 1993 and re-edited by S. R. Tokhtas'ev and, posthumously, by Yu. G. Vinogradov. The Greek text reads:

εὐξάμενος Λεύκων υἱὸς Σατύρ[ο τόδ' ἄγαλμα]
Φοίβωι Ἀπόλλωνι στῆσε τῶι ἐν Λ̣[αβρυ—(?)]
τῆσδε πόλεως μεδέοντι Λαβρύτωμ, Β̣[οσπόρο ἄρχων]
Θευδοσίης τε, μάχηι καὶ κράτει ἐξελ̣[άσας]
Ὀκταμασάδεα γῆς ἐΞινδῶν, παῖδ' Ἑκ[αταίο]
τοῦ Σινδῶμ βασιλέως, ὃς πατέρα Ο̣(?)[— — —]
ἐγβάλλων ἀρχῆς εἰς τήνδε πόλιγ κ̣[— — — —].

In fulfillment of a vow, Leucon son of Satyrus set up [this statue] to Phoebus Apollo in L[abrys(?)], guardian of this city, Labryta, being [archon of Bosporus] and Theodosia, when by battle and by force he had driven from the land of the Sindi Octamasades, son of Hec[ataeus] the king of the Sindi, who, casting his father out of power, [attacked(?)] this city.

== Sources ==
- Braund, David (2007). "The Sindians of the Taman Peninsula ca. 400 BC: Polyaenus' Tirgitao, Numismatics and Demosthenes' Grandfather". In Solovyov, S. L. (ed.). Greeks and Natives in the Cimmerian Bosporus, 7th–1st Centuries BC. BAR International Series 1729. Oxford: Archaeopress. pp. 17–21.
- Tokhtas'ev, Sergei R. (2006). "The Bosporus and Sindike in the Era of Leukon I: New Epigraphic Publications". Ancient Civilizations from Scythia to Siberia. 12 (1–2). Brill: 1–62.
