= Bosporan–Heracleote War =

4th-century BC conflict between Heraclea Pontica and Bosporan Kingdom

Bosporan wars of expansion
Date	c. 389 – 360 BCE
Location	Cimmerian Bosporus
Result	Bosporan Victory

Belligerents
Heraclea Pontica; Theodosia; Chernosseus	Bosporan Kingdom

Commanders and leaders
Tynnichus; Memnon	Satyros I †; Seleukos †; Leukon I

Strength
40 Triremes; 200+ hoplites	Unknown

Casualties and losses
High	High

The Bosporan–Heracleote War was a long and enduring conflict between the states of Heraclea Pontica and the Bosporan Kingdom. It lasted decades, but ended after the Bosporans finally conquered the city-state of Theodosia in around 360 BCE.

== Background ==
The Spartocids had early conquered the city-state of Kimmerikon, and had received Nymphaeum from Gylon of Cerameis. They were continuing their expansion into the surrounding area, and set their sights on Theodosia. Rivalries began as early was 393/2 BCE, with Satyros and his co-regent and brother Seleukos attempting to besiege Theodosia, but failing in their pre-attempt.

== Sieges and Battles ==
=== First Siege ===
The Spartocids began their official assaults on Theodosia in 389 BCE, this assault was led by Satyros and Seleukos. Seleukos however, died early in the siege, leaving his brother to besiege the city alone. Satyros had underestimated his enemies in the east and was now caught in a war on two fronts, against his former ally Tirgatao. While besieging Theodosia, Satyros himself died.

=== Second Siege ===
After settling his affairs in order and solidifying his throne, Leukon, Satyros's eldest son and successor, besieged Theodosia once more. In response to the growing Bosporan Kingdom, Heraclea Pontica decided to intervene by sending their admiral Tynnichus with a small force to take out the Bosporans surrounding their colony. Tynnichus succeeded in lifting the siege with a stratagem, and Leukon was forced to flee.

=== Insurrection ===
As a result of his failure at Theodosia, Leukon's subjects were not pleased with their king. Leukon thus took precautions and asked the merchants for aid in securing his throne. He did this by taking loans from them, and telling them that if his throne was to be lost, they would not be repaid. The merchants then took up arms and assisted their king in his affairs. After securing this throne, Leukon made good in his promise and repaid the merchants.

=== Third Siege ===
Five years after his original siege, Leukon had noticed that Tynnichus and his forces had been recalled to Heraclea Pontica after Clearchus made himself tyrant. Noticing he had a chance, he seized the moment and besieged Theodosia, finally defeating the defenders and adding it to his dominions.

=== Skirmish ===
After his victory, Leukon was attacked in his own territory by the Heracleotes. After the Heracleotes had defeated Leukon's fleet, they landed near Panticapaeum and were met by a Greco-Scythian army led by Leukon himself. Noticing that his Greeks may waver, he positioned his Scythians to the rear with orders to strike down any person that fled. This kept his forces in line and he was able to repel the Heracleote assault.

== Aftermath ==
The resulting Bosporan victory further asserted their control over the Taman peninsula, and paved the way for further expansion of the Bosporan Kingdom. The annexation of Theodosia allowed the Spartocids to use the port for their export of grain to the city-state of Athens, which would prosper under its trade with the Bosporan Kingdom.

The only later hostilities between the Bosporans and the Heracleotes is around the reign of Leukon II and his brother Spartokos IV, some time in 235 BCE.
