= Siege of Theodosia =

Siege of Theodosia can refer to:

- Siege of Theodosia (389 BC)
- Siege of Theodosia (c. 365 BC)
- Siege of Theodosia (c. 360 BC)
