= Siege of Theodosia (389 BC) =

Siege during the Bosporan-Heracleote War

- Part of Bosporan Expansion Wars
| Date | 389 BC |
| Location | Theodosia, Bosporus |
| Result | Tactical Theodosian Victory: Death of Satyros |

Belligerents
| Heraclea Pontica; Theodosia | Bosporan Kingdom |

Commanders and leaders
| Unknown | Satyros I †; Seleukos † |

Casualties and losses
| Medium | Medium |

The siege of Theodosia in 389 BC was the first of three sieges carried out against the city of Theodosia (modern day Feodosia) by the rulers of the Bosporan Kingdom, who attempted time and time again to annex the city to their dominions during the long Bosporan-Heracleote War. The first of these sieges was carried out by Satyros I, the father of Leukon I.

== Prelude ==
Satyros had recently bribed Gylon, an Athenian official of Nymphaeum, to hand over the city. He had recently acquired the city of Phanagoria as well prior to laying siege to Theodosia. He had also recently involved himself with the Sindike Kingdom, attempting to gain influence with the king Hekataios by deposing the king's wife, Tirgatao. Satyros then besieged Theodosia to attempt to make it a part of his dominions.

== Siege ==
Satyros I had been besieging Theodosia with little success until he had to shift his attention to Tirgatao, an Ixomataen queen who was wronged by Satyros and began laying both fire and sword to his land back east, as well as having killed his son Metrodoros. Heraclea Pontica came to the aid of Theodosia, perhaps possibly to protect their colony at Chersonesus from the rule of the expansionist Spartocids whose domain was ever increasing. Upon returning, Satyros died of despair while sieging at the age of 81, having had two wars that he was losing on two fronts. On his death, he passed over his throne to two of his sons, Leukon I and Gorgippos who would later finish what he began.

== Aftermath ==
Around 20 years after the death of Satyros, his son Leukon began a second Siege of Theodosia in around 365 BC. Leukon lifted this siege due to Heraclea Pontica sending Tynnichus, one of its generals, to aid the city and who succeeded in doing so. The city was conquered around 5 years after that, but the Bosporans had enraged the full wrath of Heraclea Pontica, and received another war from Heracleia Pontica.
