= Odesa Numismatics Museum =

Coordinates: 46.4825°N 30.7375°E

The Odesa Numismatics Museum
- Established: 1999
- Location: 33 Hretska Street, Odesa, Ukraine
- Director: Peter Loboda
- Website: www.museum.com.ua

The Odesa Numismatics Museum (Ukrainian: Одеський музей нумізматики, romanized: Odeskyi muzei numizmatyky) is a currency museum in Ukraine. The museum preserves and exhibits ancient relics from the Northern Black Sea Region and Rus-Ukraine.

The museum is located in the center of Odesa: at 33 Hretska Str. (Ukrainian: вулиця Грецька, 33) — Exhibition of ancient and medieval coins, old and modern Ukrainian banknotes; antique pottery of the Northern Black Sea region and fine art of Kievan Rus';. The museum branch at 5 Catherine's Sq. (Ukrainian: площа Катерининська, 5) — Coin Gallery (Монетный двор, "Monetny dvor"; literally "Monetary Court" — Exhibition of modern coins and monetary tokens of Ukraine — has been closed for a very long time. The website of the museum has not been updated to reflect the closing of this branch of the museum.

Over the last 10 years, the museum has concentrated on the augmentation, preservation and study of historical relics and the cultural heritage of the Ukrainian people. This in turn has brought numerous awards from the Ukrainian Parliament, Government, National Bank of Ukraine and from authorities of the Odesa Oblsast and the city of Odesa. The museum maintains contact with scientific, historical and cultural organizations in 100 countries of the world.

== Collection ==
The museum collections include over 2500 coins and other relics from different historical eras: from antiquity and the Middle Ages to modern times including the period of the formation of the modern Ukrainian state. The core of the collection is a collection of ancient coins minted by various city states, and especially of the Bosporan Kingdom which existed in the Northern Black Sea Region for almost a thousand years. Among them are many unique and rare coins of great scientific interest.

Besides the numismatic exhibition, the museum collection includes many other ancient Ukrainian historical artifacts: antique ceramics and items of ancient Russian fine art. Medieval small art plastics of Kievan Rus' form the separate Museum's collection reflecting the diversity of the kinds of ancient Ukrainian arts and crafts in their historical development: from pieces of ornamental and decoration dating from the Pre-Christian period of Kievan Rus (pendants, brooches "lunnitsa", amulets, signet rings) to the antiquities of the Christian Epoch (icons, crosses, cross – amulets "enkolpyons"). Metal breast plates with the Princely heraldry of Rurik dynasty (two-prong and trident) are very rare and have a special interest for Ukrainian historians.

The small but representative collection of antique pottery reveals information about the variety of utensils used by the early inhabitants of the Northern Black Sea region and the development of pottery manufacturing. Local ceramics did not achieve such a high level as the Greek but have left their traces in the methods of ceramic manufacture in the Region.

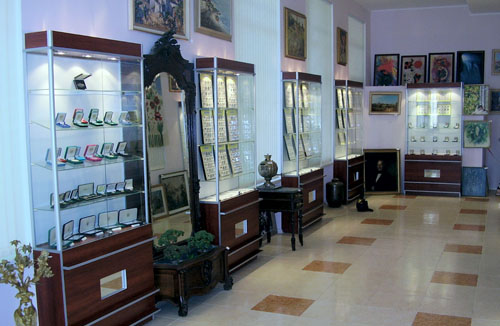
Interior of the museum

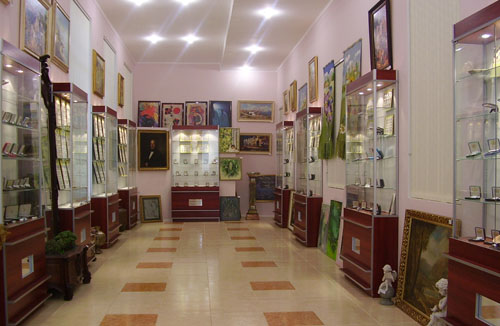
Museum branch at 5 Catherine's Square - "Monetary Court"

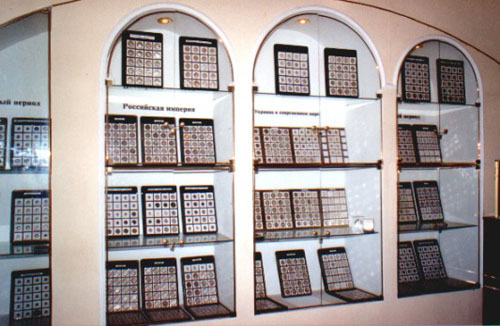
Museum branch at 33 Gretska Street

== Publications ==
Research by the Odesa Numismatics Museum is published in the periodical Bulletin of the Odesa Numismatics Museum. The bulletin includes articles on unique and rare coins from ancient cities of the Northern Black Sea region, analysis of the coins (typology, semantics of images, chronology, coin metrics and metallurgy) and attempts to link this with historical events, the economy and worldview of the times. Such publications allow us to bring to light previously unknown findings and enrich the knowledge of the coins from our region. The museum's research activity is a continuation of close to 200 year tradition of research by renowned Odesa numismatists, and contributes greatly to study of the history of the Northern Black Sea region.

The year 2004 saw the publication of the Collected Articles of Numismatics of the Northern Black Sea Region. It covered 19 issues of the "Bulletin of the Odesa Numismatics Museum" showing the results of the museum's research over the last five years. The need for this collection arose for two reasons: the growing interest in the ancient numismatics of the Northern Black Sea region, both in Ukraine as well as abroad, and the rarity of early issues of the "Bulletin" which was originally published non-commercially and in very limited editions. The collected volume contains illustrations of 363 coins, many of them rare and unique examples.

The museum's collection has been published in the Catalogue of the Collection of the Odesa Numismatics Museum, in four volumes. All volumes have been released in two language versions, Russian and English. On the basis of the museum's collection many publications have been written, as well as numerous papers for various scientific conferences and lectures or public talks.

== Exhibitions and projects ==
The museum hosts many exhibitions of ancient and modern coins and banknotes, as well as other relics from Ukraine's ancient history. Information about them appears on the museum's website.

Between the 5th and 4th centuries BC most of the main Greek cities (poleis) of the Northern Black Sea region began to mint their own silver and copper coins: Pontic Olbia, Tyras, Chersonesos, Panticapaeum, Phanagoria, Nymphaion, Sindica and others. Olbia and Panticapaeum also started to mint gold coins. Such minting continued until the latter half of the 3rd century AD.

Olbian monetary art between the last third of the 5th century BC and the final quarter of the 4th century BC is characterized by a phenomenon typical of the Hellenistic era: secularization, promotion of aesthetic principles and the spread of an archaistic style enhancing the sacred nature of the image depicted.

In the early 1970s the museum first appeared in Odesa. It was given the name "Old Odesa" and set up in the watchtower of the old destroyed fortress located in Shevchenko Park. The founder and director of this museum became the well-known Odesa regional specialist and collector Rudolf Mikhailovich Tsiporkis. He was the foremost person with an encyclopedic knowledge regarding questions concerning Odesa's history. His collection of old postcards totaled more than 1,500 pieces. Rudolf Tsiporkis lived a long and interesting life and died in 1999 at the age of 90. Appreciating the memory of a remarkable Odesan, and continuing the business he began, the Odesa Numismatics Museum in 1999 organized an exhibition of postcards and other historical documents which was given the name the Gallery "Old Odesa". Several TV programs on the culture of Odesa and its history have been based on this collection.
