= Moukaporis =

Coastal town of ancient Bithynia

Coordinates: 41°08′20″N 29°04′57″E

Moukaporis was a coastal town of ancient Bithynia located on the Bosphorus. Moukaporis, took its ancient name from a king or a noble figure of Bithynia. Dionysios described this harbor in his work, as "quite beautiful" and there is a phrase that reads "after Daphne Mainomene comes Moukaporis."

Its site is located on the Asian side of Istanbul, in the Beykoz district, in the Yalıköy neighborhood, at a place known as Hünkar İskelesi (the Sultan's Pier) of Asiatic Turkey.
