= Octamasades =

4th-century BC Sindian prince and usurper

- Usurper of the Sindian throne
- Reign: c. 380 BC (contested; possibly never enthroned)
- Born: Sindica
- Father: Hecataeus
- Mother: Possibly Tirgatao (Note: Octamasades' mother is not named in the surviving sources. Hecataeus' attested wives are the Maeotian Tirgatao and, later, a daughter of Satyrus I (Polyaenus, Stratagems 8.55).)

Octamasades (Ancient Greek: Ὀκταμασάδης, romanized: Oktamasades; Scythian: *Uxtamazatā) was a Sindian prince and usurper of the early 4th century BC, the son of king Hecataeus. Around 380 BC he attempted to seize his father's throne and attacked the town of Labryta; the Bosporan ruler Leucon I intervened in defense of Hecataeus, his vassal, defeated Octamasades at the Battle of Labryta, and expelled him from Sindica. Nothing further is known of him. He is attested only in the verse dedication that Leucon erected at Labryta after his victory.

== Name ==
The Greek name Oktamasadēs is a Hellenization of the Scythian name *Uxtamazatā, meaning "possessing greatness through his words". He shares the name with Octamasadas, a Scythian king of the 5th century BC mentioned by Herodotus. A Scythian name borne by a Sindian prince bears on the debated affiliation of the Sindi, who are commonly treated as a Scythian group ruling over a Maeotian population, though the question is not settled.

== Biography ==
Octamasades' father Hecataeus held the Sindian throne as a dependent of the Bosporan rulers. According to Polyaenus, he had been driven from his kingdom and restored by Satyrus I, who married him to his daughter and required him to put away his Maeotian wife Tirgatao, whose escape then set off a destructive war (Tirgatao's war). and Octamasades mother is not named in the sources; Hecataeus' attested wives are the Maeotian Tirgatao and, later, a daughter of Satyrus.

The dedication records that Octamasades, "casting his father out of power", attacked the city of Labryta, a Sindian town about 35 km north of the later Gorgippia. Leucon I, styled in the inscription only "[archon of Bosporus] and Theodosia", marched to the defense of his vassal, routed Octamasades' forces, and drove him out of the land of the Sindi "by battle and by force". Whether Octamasades had actually seized the throne or his coup failed at once is uncertain. His subsequent fate is unknown.

== Sources ==
- Braund, David (2007). "The Sindians of the Taman Peninsula ca. 400 BC: Polyaenus' Tirgitao, Numismatics and Demosthenes' Grandfather". In Solovyov, S. L. (ed.). Greeks and Natives in the Cimmerian Bosporus, 7th–1st Centuries BC. BAR International Series 1729. Oxford: Archaeopress. pp. 17–21.
- Tokhtas'ev, Sergei R. (2006). "The Bosporus and Sindike in the Era of Leukon I: New Epigraphic Publications". Ancient Civilizations from Scythia to Siberia. 12 (1–2). Brill: 1–62.
