= Siege of Theodosia (c. 360 BC) =

Siege during the Bosporan Expansion Wars

- Part of Bosporan Expansion Wars
Date	c. 360 BC
Location	Theodosia, Bosporus
Result	Bosporan Victory: Annexation of Theodosia into Bosporan hegemony.

Belligerents
Theodosia	Bosporan Kingdom

Commanders and leaders
Unknown	Leukon I

Strength
Unknown	Unknown

Casualties and losses
Medium	Low

The siege of Theodosia in c. 360 BC was the third and final siege by the Bosporan Kingdom under Leukon I against the city of Theodosia, a probable colony of Heraclea Pontica, who had aided the city in two previous sieges.

== Prelude ==
In the first siege, Satyros I, the father of Leukon, besieged the city but lost his life there at the age of 81. Leukon besieged the city himself but, after having been tricked by Tynnichus, retreated back to Panticapaeum. After his defeat, Leukon had to solidify his position on the throne after getting word that some of his friends and subjects were conspiring against him due his failure at Theodosia. He enlisted the aid of merchants and put down the conspiracy.

== Siege ==
Leukon, seeing that the Heracleotes had left to their colony, possibly due to problems with Clearchus of Heraclea who had made himself tyrant of Heraclea recently, laid a sneak attack on the city of Theodosia before the Heracleotes could prepare an expedition to aid the city. Leukon succeeded in finally defeating Theodosia, who robbed his father of his life in 389 BC. After defeating Theodosia however, Leukon was invaded by the Heracleotes in his own territory, but as able to repel them through the use of Scythians to maintain his Greek troops disciplined and stable.
