= Siege of Theodosia (c. 365 BC) =

Siege during the Bosporan Expansion Wars

- Part of Bosporan Expansion Wars
Date	c. 365 BC
Location	Theodosia, Bosporus
Result	Heracleote Victory

Belligerents
Heraclea Pontica; Theodosia	Bosporan Kingdom

Commanders and leaders
Tynnichus	Leukon I

Strength
1 Trireme; 1 transport 3 rowboats Less than 200 men	

Casualties and losses
Low	Low

The siege of Theodosia was a siege carried out by Leukon I sometime after his accession to the Bosporan throne in around 365 BC. Satyrus I, the father of Leukon, had previously laid siege on Theodosia but died during it. The exact numbers of the forces in the siege aren't known.

== Siege ==
After becoming king of the Bosporan Kingdom in 389 BC, Leukon would later attack the city of Theodosia perhaps as revenge for the death of his father, who died at Theodosia that same year. Tynnichus, a probable Heracleote commander, was sent with a small force to relieve the siege, numbering less than 200 men.

Tynnichus managed to send three small boats under the cover of darkness, in which each boat had a trumpeter. He then had his trumpeters make the loudest din they could possibly do, taking care that at least two were playing at the same time so that it would sound much stronger than it actually was. The Bosporan army, upon hearing the sound of what should've been an army coming to relieve the city, fled.

He also successfully defeated the Bosporans as he managed to destroy their siege weapons at night. Leukon was forced to retreat back to Panticapaeum.

== Aftermath ==
Leukon retreated back to Panticapaeum shortly after Tynnicus lifted the siege. Due to his failure at Theodosia, he had to deal with a conspiracy against his life by his closest friends and advisors. He swiftly dealt with the conspiracy with the aid of merchants and sometime in 360 BC, he attacked the city of Theodosia again, starting another siege, but this time finally being able to take the city.
