= Paerisades I =

Bosporan Kingdom ruler 342 – 310/9 BC

King of the Bosporan Kingdom and All Maeotians
- Reign: 347–309 BC
- Predecessor: Spartokos II
- Successor: Satyros II
- Born: circa 365 BC; Panticapaeum
- Died: 309 BC; Bosporan Kingdom
- Consort: Komosarye
- Issue: Satyros II; Eumelos; Prytanis; Gorgippos II; Akis
- Greek: Παιρισάδης
- House: Spartocid
- Father: Leukon I
- Mother: Theodosia
- Religion: Greek polytheism

Paerisades I (Greek: Παιρισάδης; c. 365 BC – 309 BC) also known as Birisades, Pairisades, and Parysades was a Spartocid king of the Bosporan Kingdom from 342 to 310/9 BC.

His father was Leukon I, a Bosporan king who was responsible for establishing and expanding the kingdom from a mere hegemony centred around the city of Panticapaeum to a large Hellenistic kingdom in the Cimmerian Bosporus.

== Reign ==
Paerisades was born to Leukon and a mother perhaps named Theodosia, although this is still unknown as there is no evidence of her being his mother. He was co-regent with Spartokos II when he ascended the throne, ruling as a governor over the minor parts of the kingdom, such as Theodosia, due to him not being the eldest. Paerisades became sole ruler of the Bosporan Kingdom after his elder brother Spartokos died in 342 BC after ruling for five years, from 347 to 342 BC.

At some point during his reign, Paerisades possibly married his cousin Komosarye, a daughter of his uncle Gorgippos, and they had four sons: Satyros II, likely named after his grandfather Satyros I, Eumelos, Gorgippos II, also perhaps named after Komosarye's father and Paerisades' uncle, and Prytanis. Also he had the daughter Akis. Through this marriage, he became king of the Sindians. Paerisades may have had the epithet "Epiphanes", which means "god-manifest", or perhaps "Theos", meaning "god", due to his people often praising him as divine and honouring him as a god.

In combat, Paerisades wore three outfits for three occasions. He wore one outfit when reviewing his troops, another when he was in battle, and lastly, he wore one when he was forced to flee from battle. He did this so that, while reviewing his troops, he would be known by everyone; during combat, he would not be known by the enemy; and once forced to flee, nobody would know that it was he.

He was also an active military leader, possibly taking Tanais and subjugating many tribes around the Maeotic Swamp and expanding the kingdom more than his father did in the Bosporan Expansion Wars, as well as waging war against the Scythians at some point during his reign.

== Death ==
Paerisades died in 310 (or 309) BC, having ruled for about 38 years as Bosporan king. Upon his death, Satyros II, Prytanis, and Eumelos engaged in the Bosporan Civil War because Eumelos had a claim to throne and was allied to Aripharnes while Satyros would not stand for it and waged war against his brother. The victor, Eumelos, greatly expanded the kingdom during his short five-year reign.
