= Royal Kurgan =

Kurgan in eastern Crimea, Ukraine

Coordinates: 45.3739°N 36.5260°E

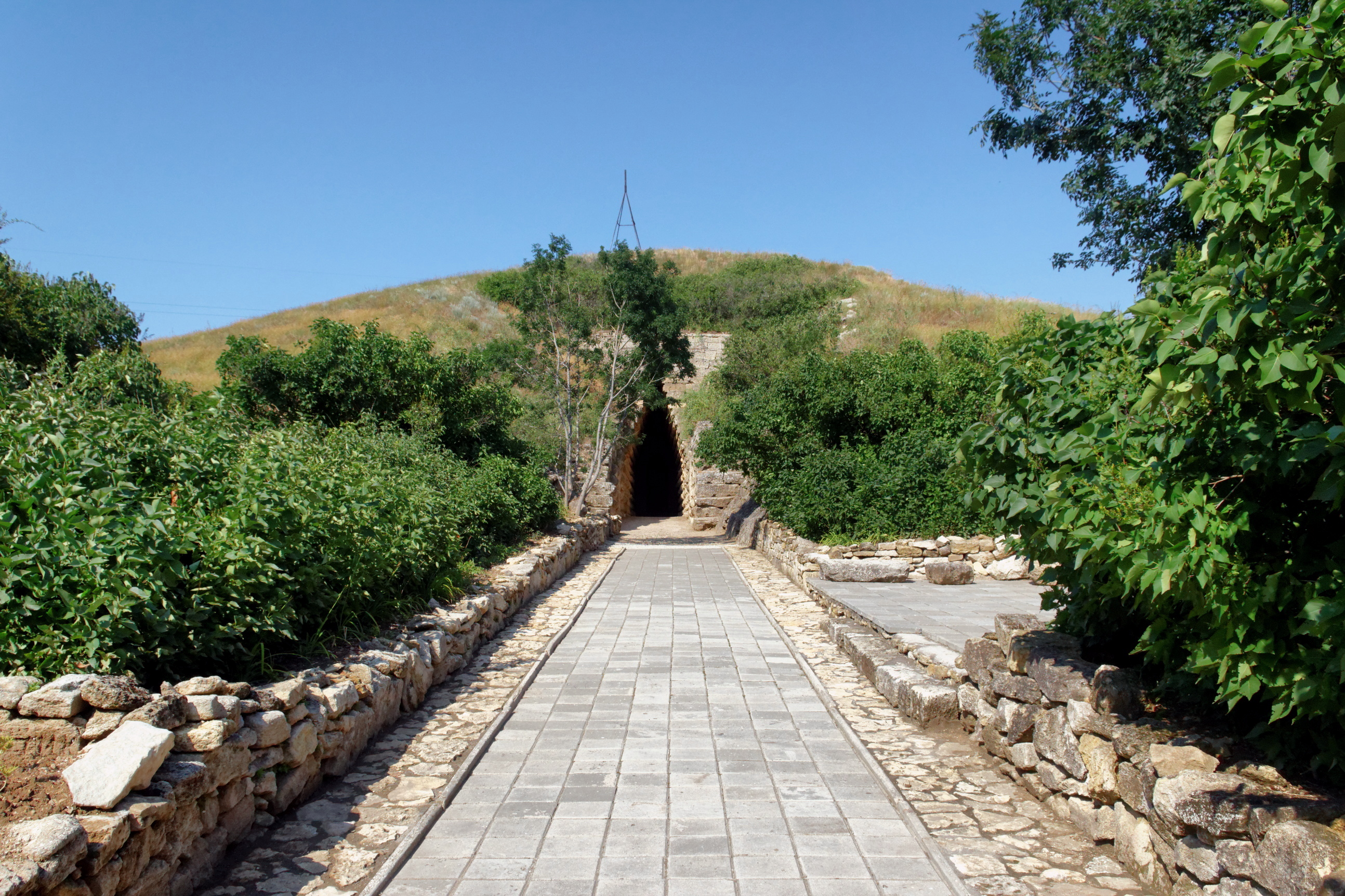
- Royal Kurgan in Kerch
- Interactive map of Royal Kurgan

Immovable Monument of National Significance of Ukraine
- Official name: Царський курган (Royal Kurgan)
- Type: Architecture
- Reference no.: 010050

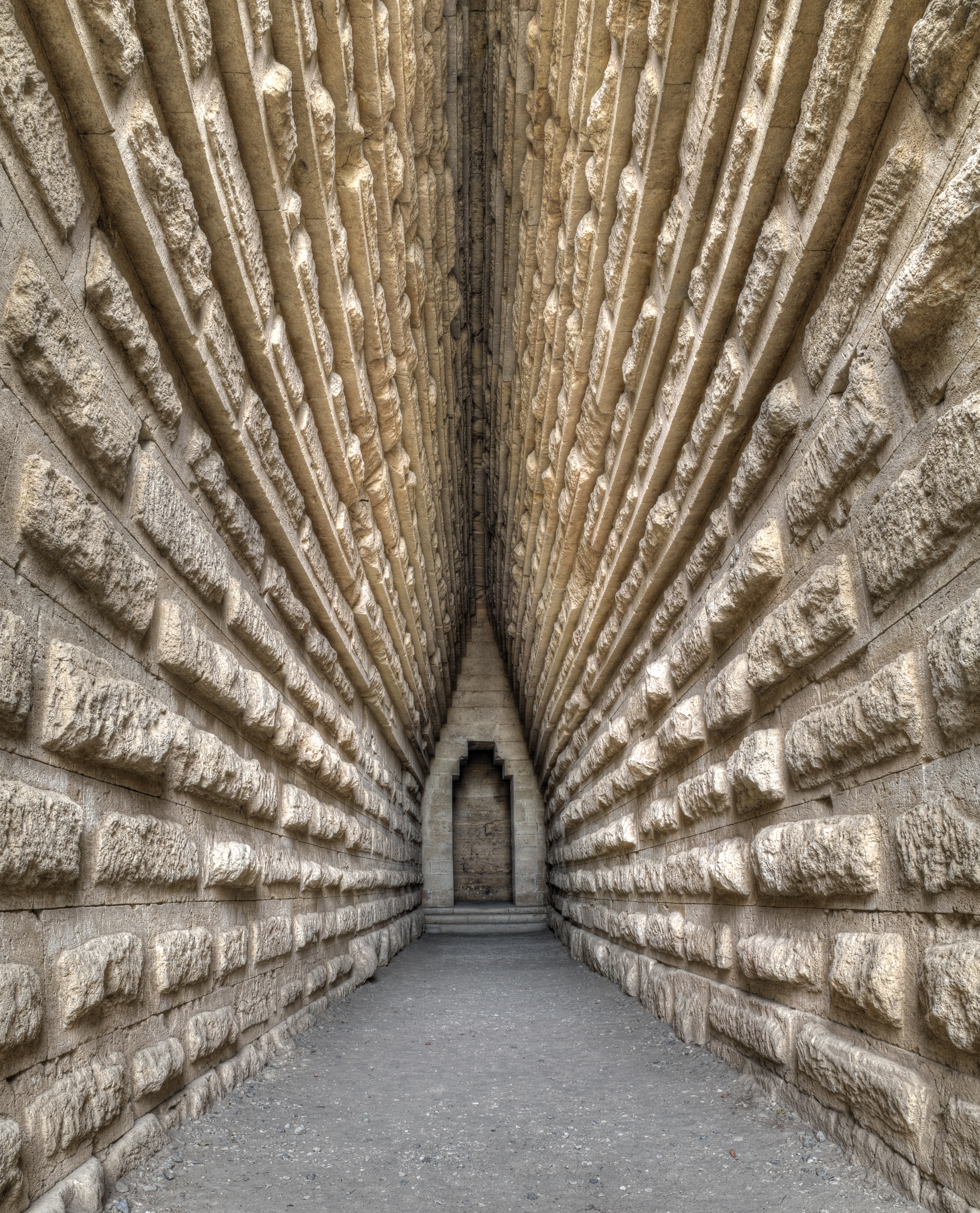
Royal Kurgan of Kerch

The Royal Kurgan or Tsarskyi Kurgan (Ukrainian: Царський курган) from the 4th century BC, is one of the most impressive tumuli (kurgans) of the eastern Crimea. The burial barrow is located at Kul-Oba in present-day Kerch (Ukraine), which developed out of the ancient Greek town of Pantikapaion (Παντικάπαιον) founded by Miletus.

== Background ==
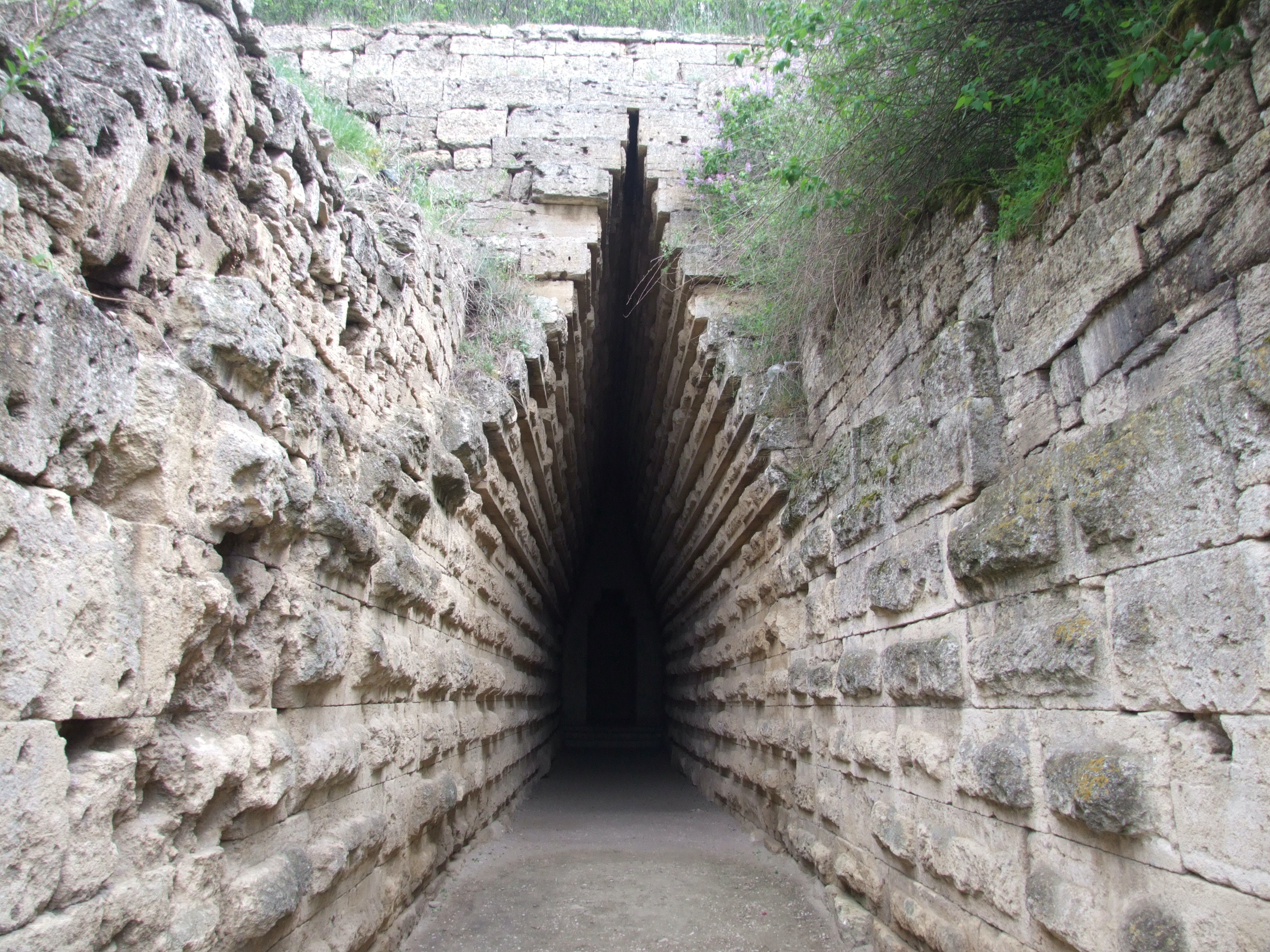
Royal Kurgan entrance

About 200 burial mounds exist in Kerch and its immediate surroundings. The Royal Kurgan is located about 5 km northeast of the town centre, close to the memorial to the defenders of the Adzhimushkay quarry. The mound is almost 20 metres high and its base perimeter is about 250 meters. It holds a burial chamber with a square floor plan (4.39 m X 4.35 m), which gradually merges into the circular shape of a corbelled dome ("false vault"). The total height of the burial chamber is 8.84 meters. Also the generous dromos, a 2.80-meter-wide and 37-meter-long entrance passage, is built in the corbelled vault technique. Both parts of the building are made of yellowish limestone blocks and have a floor from a tamped mix of clay, lime and limestone.

It is assumed that the Royal Kurgan, a masterpiece of ancient architecture, was the final resting place of a ruler of the Bosporan Kingdom. This was founded in the 5th century BC from the Greek colonies in the northern Black Sea region and at the Sea of Azov. The kurgan could in particular have been the tomb of Leukon of Bosporus (389-349 BC). In the course of excavations in the years 1833 until 1837, the kurgan was opened. It contained only remnants of a wooden sarcophagus, so it is possible it was robbed long ago. Christian symbols carved on the walls suggest that the grave rooms served early Christians as a place of refuge and as a sanctuary.

A lapidarium is located inside the enclosure of the barrow. The small museum displays archaeological finds from ancient times, including pedestals, grave stelae, and sarcophagi.

== Bibliography ==
- Зинько В. Н. (1998). Археологические прогулки по античной Керчи [Archaeological Walks in Ancient Kerch].
