= Oxinas =

Town on the eastern coast of ancient Bithynia

Coordinates: 41°24′26″N 31°40′29″E

Oxinas or Oxines (Ancient Greek: Ὀξίνης) was a town on the eastern coast of ancient Bithynia located on the Black Sea, probably near the mouth of the river of the same name.

Its site is tentatively located at Oksina, Asiatic Turkey.
