= Spartocus I =

Ruler of the Bosporan Kingdom from c. 438 to 432 BC

- Ruler of the Bosporan Kingdom
- Reign: c. 438-432 BC
- Predecessor: Sagaurus(?)
- Successor: Satyrus I and Seleucus
- Born: c. 500 BC
- Died: 432 BC; Bosporan Kingdom
- Consort: Unknown
- Issue: Satyrus I; Seleucus
- Greek: σπαρτόκο
- House: Spartocid
- Father: Unknown
- Mother: Unknown

Spartocus I (Greek: Σπάρτοκος, romanized: Spartokos) was the founder and first ruler of the Spartocid dynasty in the Bosporan Kingdom. He usurped the former rulers of the Bosporus, the Archaeanactids, after being a mercenary under their command sometime in 438 BC.

== Life and Reign ==
Little to nothing is known of Spartocus' early life. He may have been a member of the Odrysian dynasty of rulers in Thrace, possibly making him of Thracian origin, but this is disputed. Around 438 BC, he seized the tyranny from the Archaeanactids either peacefully or by force, possibly using his background to get control of the Bosporan army. He also forged trade agreements with the Athenians, though not to the extent of his grandson Leukon. In a speech before an audience of Athenians in the years 395-390 BCE, he was said to have considered the Athenians the most "important of the Greeks" and provided them first with his grain. He also played a small, yet notable part in the Bosporan wars of expansion, a series of wars and conflicts that would expand his dynasty's realm.

== Succession ==
Spartocus was succeeded by his sons Seleucus and Satyrus who jointly reigned together. Satyrus continued his father's aggressive policy of expansion and his grandson after him, creating a powerful kingdom in the Cimmerian Bosporus. His dynasty would endure some 300 years, and he would have at least 5 descendants to bear his name.
