= Nymphaeum (Bithynia) =

Nymphaeum or Nymphaion (Ancient Greek: Νύμφαιον or Νυμφαῖον) was a town on the eastern coast of ancient Bithynia located on the Black Sea, at a distance of 30 stadia west of the mouth of the Oxines, or 45 stadia from Tyndaridae.

Its site is unlocated.
