= Kleobule =

Mother of orator Demosthenes

- Born: 408 BC
- Died: 4th century BC
- Children: Demosthenes

Kleobule, (in Ancient Greek: Κλεόβουλη), born between 408 and 400 BC, was a notable figure in classical Athens. She is known for being the mother of the orator and politician Demosthenes.

== Biography ==
Kleobule was born between 408 and 400 BC. She was attacked by Aeschines, who accused her of not being Athenian but a Scythian or a Thracian, although these claims do not appear to be necessarily true. Her father Gylon was an Athenian citizen nonetheless, who was branded a "traitor" for his actions during the Peloponnesian War. She married Demosthenes the Elder, and they had several children, including Demosthenes. Regardless of her origins, she received a substantial dowry for her marriage, indicating she came from a wealthy background.

Her husband, being older than she was, fell ill; in his will, he entrusted their children to a certain Aphobus, who was likely a relative. Aphobus was also supposed to marry Kleobule in exchange for a dowry of 12,000 drachmas. However, he neither married Kleobule nor took care of the children, and he squandered all the money left by Demosthenes the Elder for his son; 14 talents supposedly turned into just one.

Aphobus eventually left the family home; he was sued by Demosthenes, who succeeded in taking him to court and recovering 10 talents. It seems that during this trial, Aphobus insulted Kleobule, but this is not certain. The speech related to this case is called Against Aphobus.

She died at an unknown date. Most of the knowledge about her comes not from Demosthenes' speeches, but from those of some of his adversaries, such as Aeschines, and from later biographical anecdotes about Demosthenes, whose reliability is not always very certain.
