= Sopaios =

4th-century BC minister to Bosporan king Satyros I

- Born: Sopaios
- Died: c.370 BC
- Issue: Unnamed son; Theodosia
- Occupation: Magistrate of Satyros I

Sopaios (Greek: Σωπάιος) or Sopaeus or Sinopeus (fl. 390 BC) was a powerful Bosporan minister to Satyros I, the father of queen Theodosia, and father-in-law to Leukon I.

== Biography ==
Sopaios was a native of the Bosporan Kingdom who was greatly influential during the reign of Satyros I. Sopaios controlled major regions of the kingdom and the king's military forces. His daughter, named Theodosia, married one of Satyros's sons, Leukon. Sopaios, as an aristocratic nobleman, was able to send his son to the school of Isocrates in Athens. Sopaios lived in a country palace of significant size, with one of his sons boasting while in Athens "I, who live in Pontus and possess so large an estate that I am even able to assist others!"

Sopaios, however, was suspected of treason and was arrested. According to Moreno, the Spartocids could take away what they could easily give and ordered the Bosporans who lived in Athens to confiscate Sopaios's son's possessions and force him to return, even if it meant raising the matter with the Athenian authorities. However, it seems that Sopaios was later acquitted of all his crimes and was brought back into the king's favour who later allowed his son to marry Sopaios's daughter, Theodosia.
