= Nymphaeum (Laconia) =

Coordinates: 36°26′23″N 23°08′23″E

Nymphaeum or Nymphaion (Ancient Greek: Νύμφαιον) was a harbour town of ancient Laconia between Boeae and Cape Malea. It had a statue of Poseidon standing, and a cave close to the sea; in it was a spring of sweet water. Its district was reported by Pausanias (2nd century) to be well populated.

Its site is tentatively located near the modern Ag. Marina.
