= Callichorus =

Ancient river of Bithynia

Callichorus or Kallichoros (Ancient Greek: Καλλίχορος), also called Oxines or Oxinas (Ancient Greek: Ὀξίνης), was a river of ancient Bithynia. It is mentioned by Pliny the Elder and also by the author of the Periplus of Pseudo-Scylax under the name Callichorus. Under the name Oxinas, it is mentioned by Arrian as draining into the Pontus Euxinus between Heraclea Pontica and Phyllium. Called Oxines by Marcianus, who places its mouth 90 stadia northeast of Cape Posidium.

It is tentatively identified with the modern Ilıksu. At the point where this river flows into the Black Sea, there is also an ancient settlement bearing the same name.
