= Kepoi =

Ancient city near Cimmerian Bosporus

Coordinates: 45.3031°N 36.9933°E

Kepoi or Cepoi (Ancient Greek: Κῆποι, Russian: Кепы) was an ancient Greek colony situated on the Taman Peninsula, three kilometres to the east of Phanagoria, in the present-day Krasnodar Krai of Russia. The colony was established by the Milesians in the 6th century BC. In the Hellenistic period, it was controlled by the kings of the Cimmerian Bosporus, who (according to Aeschines) made a present of a place called "the Gardens" to Gylon, the grandfather of Demosthenes. The town reached its peak in the 1st centuries AD, but the Huns and Goths put an end to its prosperity in the 4th century. Soviet excavations, started in 1957, yielded rich finds, including a marble statue of a Greek goddess ("Aphrodite of Taman"). More than 400 burials were explored at Kepoi in the 1960s and 1970s; the rest of the site has been submerged by the Sea of Azov.

== See also ==
- List of ancient Greek cities
