= Nymphaeum (Cilicia) =

Nymphaeum or Nymphaion (Ancient Greek: Νύμφαιον or Νυμφαῖον) was a town of ancient Cilicia that, according to Pliny the Elder was located between Celenderis and Soli.

Its site is unlocated.
