= Tynnichus =

6th-century BC Greek poet

Tynnichus (in Greek: Τύννιχος, fl. 6th century BC) was an ancient Greek doric poet from Chalcis. He developed distinctive paeans with musical accompaniment in honor of the god Apollo, particularly for the cessation of infectious diseases. This form of poetry, more religious in nature, was first perfected in Crete and from there spread to Delphi, ancient Sparta, and other regions of ancient Greece.

He is mentioned in Plato's dialogue "Ion" as an example, noting that none of his works are memorable except for his paean, which is widely sung and perhaps one of the most beautiful odes ever created, described by Tynnichus himself as an invention of the Muses.

Aeschylus, in particular, admired the ancient majesty in Tynnichus' paean, suggesting that it was not a recent composition at the time.
