= Daphne Mainomene =

Coastal town of ancient Bithynia

Coordinates: 41°09′12″N 29°04′43″E

Daphne Mainomene, also called Nymphaeum or Nymphaion (Ancient Greek: Νύμφαιον or Νυμφαῖον), was a coastal town of ancient Bithynia located on the Bosphorus.

Its site is tentatively located near Umur yeri in Asiatic Turkey.
