= Gylon =

Maternal grandfather of Demosthenes

Gylon (Ancient Greek: Γύλων), also known as Gylon of Cerameis, was a Greek military official and the maternal grandfather of Demosthenes. He is known for his role in the capture and ultimately turning over of Nymphaeum to the Bosporans, for which he was punished.

Nymphaeum fell under Athenian rule when Gylon captured the city and established a garrison there, along the strategically important grain route. Until that time, the city was influenced by the Scythians. He was said to have lived in Ancient Crimea (Bosporan Kingdom). Gylon is said to have betrayed Nymphaeum to "the enemy" when in 405 BC, he handed it to the Bosporan King Satyros in exchange for needed grain. One theory is that it was no longer feasible for the Athenians to maintain the outpost. but Glyon was punished for his role in letting go of Nyphaeum. He was first sentenced to death, but the punishment was later changed to a fine that Demosthenes paid off.

Gylon married a woman of nobility from Scythia. They had a daughter, Cleobule (Ancient Greek: Κλεοβούλη), who married Demosthenes Senior and they had a son Demosthenes.
