= Sindi people =

Ancient people from the Black Sea region

Sindi
- Language: Scythian; Maeotian; Ancient Greek (ethnolinguistic affiliation disputed; see Origins)
- Religion: Scythian religion Maeotian religion Ancient Greek religion

The Sindi (Ancient Greek: Σίνδοι, romanized: Síndoi; Adyghe: Щынджыхэр; Ubykh: Шинджишвё; Latin: Sindi) were an ancient people of the Taman Peninsula and the adjacent Black Sea coast of western Ciscaucasia, where their country was known to the Greeks as Sindica (Ancient Greek: Σινδική, romanized: Sindikḗ). They are commonly treated as a Scythian group ruling over a Maeotian population, though their ethnic and linguistic affiliation is disputed. The most heavily Hellenized of the peoples of the northern Black Sea coast, the Sindi formed a short-lived kingdom in Sindica, which was absorbed into the Bosporan Kingdom in the early 4th century BC. A portion of the Sindi also lived in Central Europe. Their name is variously written: Pomponius Mela calls them Sindones, and Lucian Sindianoi.

== Origins ==
The linguistic and ethnic affiliation of the Sindi cannot be reliably identified: no Sindian inscriptions have been discovered within the territory of Sindica, and the Sindi were the most heavily Hellenized of the local regional groups. Consequently, the only available research material has been the toponymy of Sindica, which has survived primarily in the form of Scythian glosses preserved within ancient Greek texts. In his study "On the Sindi and Their Language" and later in "Indoarica" (1999), O. N. Trubachyov advanced the hypothesis that the Sindi, like other Maeotian tribes, were "local Proto-Indo-Europeans, distinct from the neighboring Indo-Iranians. The Sindo-Maeotian language is Indo-Aryan, with the characteristics of an independent dialect (or dialects)."

N. V. Anfimov maintained a critical view of Trubachyov's hypothesis, arguing that these conclusions were highly controversial. Anfimov proposed instead that the Sindi belonged to the Caucasian peoples, allowing for the active participation of the Sindi, as part of the wider Maeotian tribal group, in the ethnogenesis of the Adyghe (Circassian) people. Yu. S. Krushkol likewise classified the Sindi among the indigenous Caucasian tribes.

A. M. Novichikhin regarded the Sindi as a syncretic ethnic formation that over a relatively long historical period seamlessly combined not only the cultural but also the linguistic traditions of both the migratory Caucasian populations and the native, local inhabitants.

== Earliest mentions ==
The earliest surviving reference to the Sindi is a fragment of the 6th-century BC iambic poet Hipponax, who uses the phrase "Sindian cleft" as an obscene term for the female genitalia. The joke assumes that the name was already familiar to an eastern Aegean audience, perhaps through the trade in slaves and other goods from the region.

Herodotus (completed c. 426 BC) treats the Sindi as the inhabitants of the Taman Peninsula, the counterpart of the Scythians of the eastern Crimea: he describes Scythian forces crossing the frozen Cimmerian Bosporus on the ice to attack the Sindi (Herodotus 4.28), and reckons the widest crossing of the Black Sea from Sindica to Themiscyra on the Thermodon (Herodotus 4.86). For Herodotus, Sindica is a region rather than a city, essentially the Taman Peninsula itself. Later geographers, from the Periplus of Pseudo-Scylax to Strabo, describe the extent of the Sindian country and its towns; for the details, see Sindica.

== Relation to the Maeotians ==
Whether the Sindi themselves counted as Maeotians was already an open question in antiquity. Hellanicus and Pseudo-Scylax distinguish the Sindi from the Maeotians, while Pseudo-Scymnus and Strabo treat them as a Maeotian people, and Stephanus of Byzantium records that "some say the Sindian race is an offshoot of the Maiotai". Bosporan royal inscriptions kept the two apart: the Sindi are named individually and contrasted with "(all) the Maiotai", a collective term for the lesser tribes of the Kuban region such as the Toretae, Dandarii and Psessi (CIRB 971, 972, 1015).

== Kingdom of Sindica ==
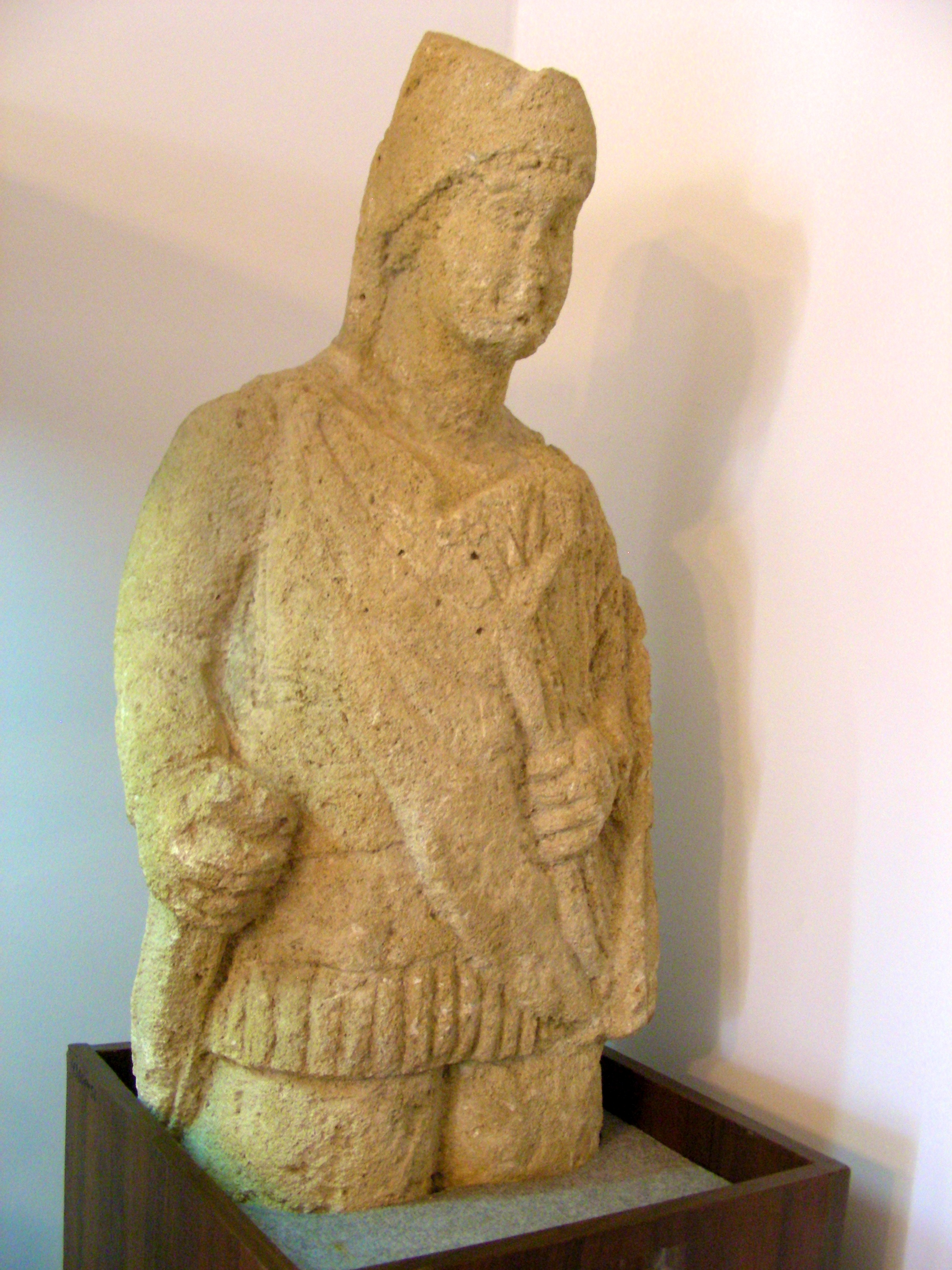
Sindi warrior statue. Limestone, 1st century AD. Kerch Archaeology Museum.

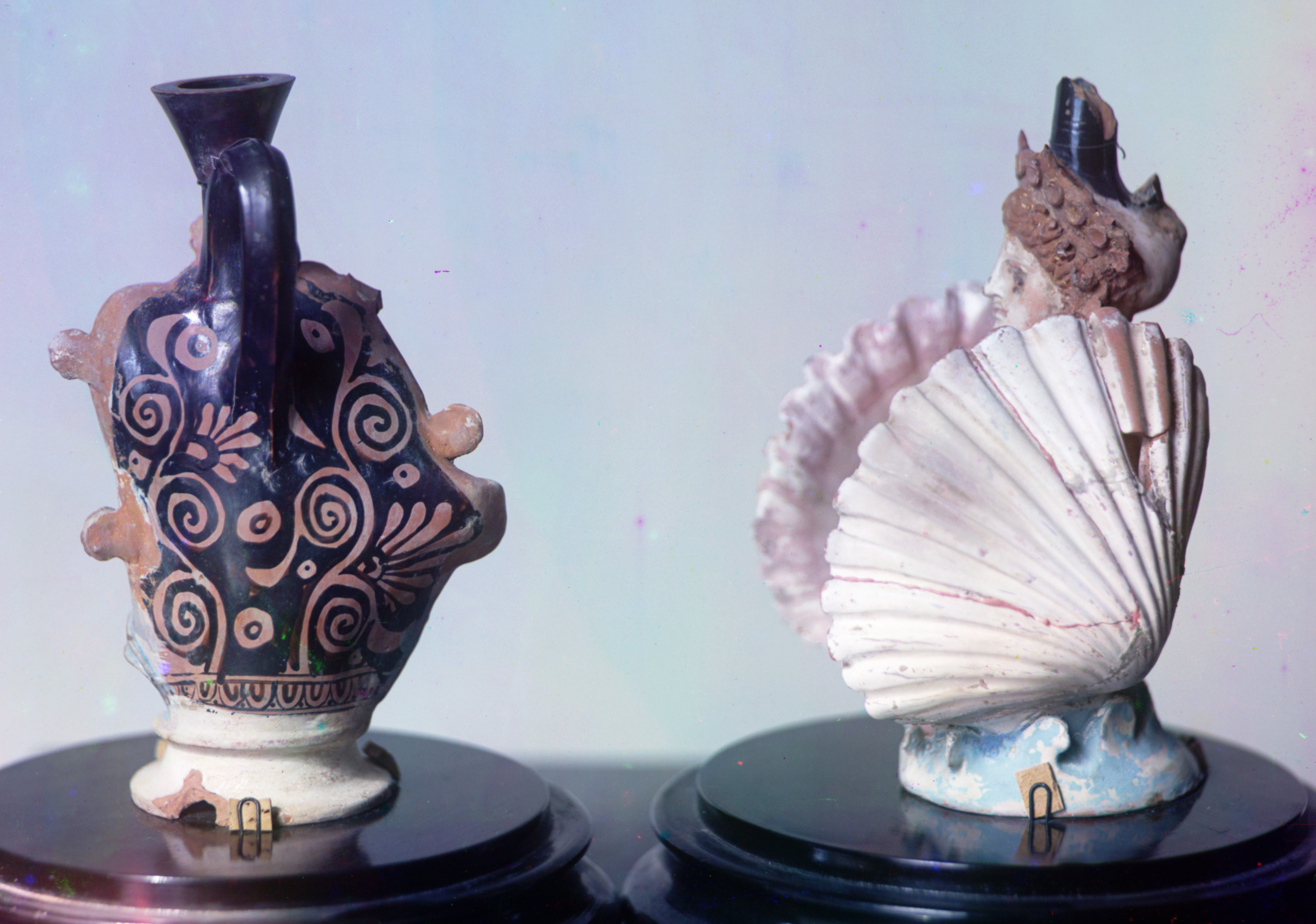
Ancient terracotta vessels unearthed at the Sindian necropolis near Phanagoria. Photograph by Prokudin-Gorskii (c. 1912).

The Sindi established themselves on the Taman Peninsula, where they are generally thought to have formed a ruling class over the indigenous Maeotian population; the gap between the two is visible in the contrast between the richly furnished kurgans of the Sindian elite and the flat cemeteries of their subjects. Archaeologically, the Sindi belonged to the Scythian culture, and they became the most heavily Hellenized of the Black Sea tribes: they adopted the Greek language and script, names and customs, trade and financial instruments from the Greeks, participated in Greek athletic competitions and religious cults, and wore Greek jewelry. This influence was evidently mutual: the Sindo-Maeotians integrated freely into Hellenic cities and were represented across all strata of the population, from the ruling class to slaves.

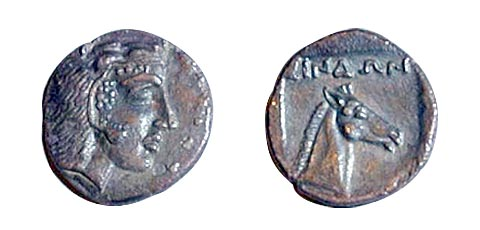
Silver coin of Sindica, a diobol of the 5th century BC.

By around 400 BC the Sindi were ruled by kings, of whom two are known by name: Hecataeus, the subject of a tale in Polyaenus about his Maeotian wife Tirgitao and the war she raised against the Sindians and Bosporans, and his son Octamasades, who attempted to depose his father and was expelled by the Bosporan ruler Leucon I (SEG 48 1027). In the later 5th century BC silver coins were struck with the legend ΣΙΝΔΩΝ, "of the Sindians"; the prevailing view is that they were issued by the Greek town of the Sindian Harbor (later Gorgippia) on behalf of the Sindi, though the attribution and dating remain debated.

Sindica was annexed by the Bosporan Kingdom during the reign of Leucon I, probably in the 380s BC; the native monarchy was dissolved, Leucon's brother Gorgippus governed the country, and its chief town, the Sindian Harbor, was renamed Gorgippia. Under Bosporan rule the Sindi retained their identity as a named subject people: they head the list of native peoples in the royal titulature down to Paerisades I, and Sindica remained a distinct administrative district of the Bosporan state into the Roman period.

== Central Europe ==
Unlike the majority of the Sindi, who remained in the northern Caucasus, a smaller section of the Sindi migrated westward and settled into the Hungarian Plain as part of the expansion of the Scythian into Central Europe during the 7th to 6th centuries BC, and they soon lost contact with the Scythians who remained in the Pontic Steppe. The 3rd century BC Greek author Apollonius of Rhodes located a population of the Sindi living alongside the Sigynnae and the otherwise unknown Grauci in the "plain of Laurion", which is likely the eastern part of the Pannonian Basin.

== Last mentions of the Sindi ==
One of the final mentions of the Sindi dates back to the 4th century AD, made by Rufus Festus Avienus in his work "Description of the Earth" (Descriptio orbis terrae), where he wrote:

Learn, finally, which peoples surround the Taurus. The Maeotians are the first to surround the salty marsh. The fierce Sarmat is also encountered... The nearest areas are inhabited by the Cimmerians and the Sindi. Nearby lives the Kerketian tribe and the lineage of the Torets.

== Customs and traditions ==
A fragment of the Collection of Customs of Nicolaus of Damascus (late 1st century BC), preserved in the Anthology of the 5th-century compiler Stobaeus, records a curious Sindian funerary custom. The Sindians were said to place a fish on the grave of the deceased for each enemy killed.

== Archaeology ==
=== North Caucasus ===
The Scythian ruling class in the Maeotian country initially buried their dead in kurgans while the native Maeotian populace were buried in flat cemeteries. Burials in Sindica continued this tradition, and members of the Sindi ruling class continued being buried in kurgans while the Maeotians continued to be buried in flat graves.

After earlier Scythian earthworks built in the 6th century BC along the right bank of the Kuban river were abandoned in the 4th century BC, when the Sauromatians took over most of Ciscaucasia, the Sindi built a new series of earthworks on their eastern borders. One of the Sindi earthworks was located at Yelizavetinskaya, where was located a c. 400 BC kurgan in which several humans were buried and which contained the skeletons of 200 horses.

== Genetics ==
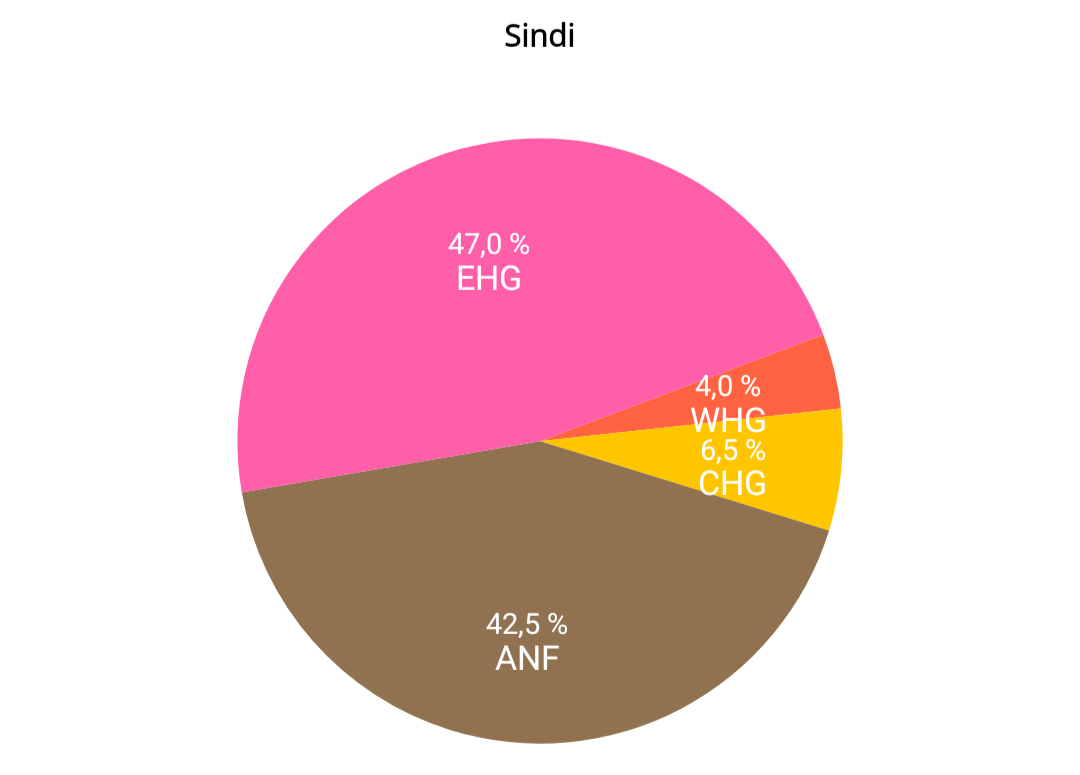
Autosomal DNA of Hungarian Sindi

The Hungarian Sindi (the Central-European branch; see above) had almost equal proportions of Neolithic origin and steppe ancestry, associated with the Yamnaya culture; there is also a minor contribution of Western Hunter-Gatherers.
