= Gorgippus =

King of the Bosporan Kingdom, joint ruler with his brother Leucon

King of Bosporus
- Reign: 389–349 BCE
- Predecessor: Satyrus I
- Successor: Spartocus II and Paerisades I

King of Sindoi
- Reign: 389–349 BCE
- Predecessor: Hecataeus
- Successor: Comosarye I
- Born: c. 410 BCE; Bosporan Kingdom
- Died: 349 BCE (aged 40+); Bosporan Kingdom
- Issue: Comosarye I; Satyrus III; Ambrocus(?)
- House: Spartocid
- Father: Satyrus I

Gorgippus (Ancient Greek: Γοργιππος, romanized: Gorgippos) was a son of Satyrus I and was a Spartocid joint ruler with his brother Leucon (389–349 BCE) of the Bosporan Kingdom. He situated himself on the Asiatic side of the kingdom, in Gorgippia where he ruled until, presumably, his death in 349 BCE.

== Wars of Expansion ==
Gorgippus was a prominent figure of the Bosporan Wars of Expansion, after he became joint-ruler of the Bosporan Kingdom alongside his brother Leukon upon the death of their father Satyros I. He seems to have ended the war his father had unsuccessfully begun with queen Tirgatao of the Maeotians, who had been wronged by Satyrus earlier on in diplomatic relations with Hecataeus. Additionally, he seems to have renamed Sindia, the capital of the Sindike Kingdom, to Gorgippia, after himself.

In a speech against the Athenian orator Demosthenes, Gorgippus was described as one of the "detested tyrants", alongside Paerisades I and Satyrus I for whom Demosthenes had erected statues in Athens due to his grandfather's relation with the Spartocids. The same speech claimed that Demosthenes received a thousand bushels of grain from Gorgippus annually.

Gorgippus' daughter, Comosarye, may have been of Sindian descent. She married her cousin Paerisades I, a son of Leucon and later ruler of the Bosporan Kingdom.
