= Leucon I =

Archon of the Bosporus from 389 to 349 BC

- Archon of the Bosporus, Theodosia, all Sindike
- Reign: 389–349 BC
- Predecessor: Satyrus I
- Successor: Spartokos II and Paerisades I
- Born: c. 410 BC; Panticapaeum
- Died: 349 BC (aged c. 60); Bosporan Kingdom
- Burial: Royal Kurgan
- Consort: Theodosia
- Issue: Spartocus II; Paerisades I; Apollonius; Orchamus
- Greek: Λεύκων
- House: Spartocid
- Father: Satyrus I
- Mother: Unknown
- Religion: Greek Polytheism

Leucon I of Bosporus (Greek: Λεύκων, romanized: Leukon, lived c. 410–349 BC) also known as Leuco, was a Spartocid ruler of the Bosporan Kingdom who ruled from 389 to 349 BC. He was arguably the greatest ruler of the Bosporan Kingdom.

He was the son of Satyrus I (432–389 BC) and the grandson of Spartocus I, the first Spartocid ruler of the Bosporan Kingdom. Leucon ruled his kingdom jointly with his brother Gorgippus, who situated himself on the Asiatic side and ruled from Gorgippia, which he named after himself. Leucon was succeeded by his sons Spartocus II (349–342 BC) and Paerisades I (349–309).

He continued his father's war against Theodosia and Chersonesus with the goal of annexing all the Greek colonies in the Bosporus. He also made Sindike his vassal upon defeating Octamasades, and in an inscription from Nymphaion he is described as "archon of the Bosporus, Theodosia, all Sindike". He also created a foreign and trade policy outside the Black Sea, significantly with Athens, a commercial friend of the Spartocids.

== Early life and reign ==
Leukon was born to Satyrus I, a ruler of the Bosporan Kingdom who had become king after the death of his father, Spartocus I, a man of Thracian descent with possible ties to the Odrysian royal dynasty, who usurped the former Greek Archaeanactid dynasty. Leukon may have been taught by Isocrates.To his Greek subjects, Leukon was merely an "Archon", but to the tribes in his dominions, he was "king". Nonetheless, the Athenians viewed him as a tyrant but nonetheless a friend of Athens. He was present during his father's unsuccessful war against the barbarian queen Tirgatao of the Ixomatae, where his brother Metrodoros died as a hostage. He became king with his brother Gorgippus after their father died during the unsuccessful first siege of Theodosia. Upon becoming king, he attacked the city of Theodosia at first without success, but continued to attack it until the city was defeated, both times being aided by Heraclea Pontica, probably to finish what his father began prior to his own death.

At some point during his reign, he married a woman named Theodosia, possibly the daughter of a powerful Bosporan diplomat named Sopaeus. They had three sons named Spartocus II, Apollonius, and Paerisades I.

Leucon also initiated a semi-fraudulent coinage reform in which he recalled all coins from the region to be minted into new coins with double the face value.

Leucon also faced early problems with his subjects; he had to enlist the aid of merchants to successfully put down a rebellion fomented by some members of his court and even trusted friends. According to Aeneas Tacticus, How to Survive under Siege, he dismissed his guards who owed gambling debts, because their loyalty could not be assured during a city siege.

== Military campaigns ==
Leukon had inherited several wars from his father, including one against the Ixomatae, led by queen Tirgatao, ending with the unsuccessful siege to Theodosia that claimed his father's life. He and his brother Gorgippos made peace with the Ixomatae and focused their attentions to the west.

=== Siege of Theodosia (c. 365 BC) ===
The cities of Theodosia and Chersonesus.

After his father's death and his ascendance to the throne, Leukon laid siege the city of Theodosia twice. The first siege ended in a Bosporan defeat due to Tynnichus, a general sent by Heraclea Pontica, to relieve the city, which he accomplished, despite inferior numbers, due to trickery.

=== Siege of Theodosia (c. 360 BC) ===
Leucon besieged Theodosia again 5 years later in a surprise attack, before the city could receive relief aid from the Heracleotes. It is possible that the Heracleotes withdrew before Leucon attacked due to a change of government from oligarchy to tyranny under Clearchus.

He was then attacked by the Heracleotes in his own territory. Leucon, noticing that his own troops could be routed easily, positioned his Scythian soldiers in the rear and gave clear instructions that his men were to be struck down if they fled. This precaution helped his army defeat the Heracleotes. Shortly after his victory, Leucon made a peace treaty with the Heracleotes, ending the war.

=== Annexation of the Sindike Kingdom ===
Leucon then turned his eye to the Sindike Kingdom, where there had been a dynastic dispute between Hecataeus, the king of the Sindi, and his son, Octamasades who had taken power from his father. Before the Battle of Labrytai, Leucon said he “made a vow to erect a victory monument, not to the local Apollo of Labrys, but to the supreme deity and patron of all the Bosporans, Apollo the Healer”. After defeating Octamasades, it is possible Leucon persuaded Hecataeus to surrender the kingship to him, as he was proclaimed "king of all the Sindike" shortly thereafter.

== Later reign ==
=== Conflict with Memnon of Rhodes ===
Probably during the last years of Leucon's reign, Heraclea Pontica may have hired Memnon of Rhodes, the famous guerrilla fighter who had fought Alexander. Heraclea Pontica sent envoys to Leucon to learn the size of his army. Upon hearing that there were not many soldiers, Memnon went to battle Leucon, and used trickery to gain an easy victory against the Bosporan army. Memnon had his army march over to a hill, leaving only half of his men visible, as if to show that there was desertion amongst his troops. He then dispatched a "deserter" to inform the Bosporan army that there had been a mutiny in the Heracleote army. The Bosporan forces marched out to Memnon's forces, believing that they had been split in half, but were defeated as in reality the army was completely intact.

=== Relations with Athens ===
Leucon was well regarded by the Athenians, as the Bosporan Kingdom exported a large portion of their grain primarily to Athens. In 356 BC, when Athens could not make do on their payment because of restrictions Sparta had placed on them during the Peloponnesian War, he gave them 400,000 medimnoi (around 16,380 t) free of charge. For this, Leucon was praised in Athens and was both given citizenship and statues of him and his sons erected in Athens. This policy was continued by his descendants, such as Spartocus III, who gave Athens 15,000 medimnoi of grain (ca 590 t) as a gift. They would continue to follow this diplomatic friendship with the Athenians. Leucon also gave Athenian ships privileges at his ports and did not have them taxed when they docked.

=== Death and legacy ===
Leucon died in 349 BC, after a reign of around forty years. He was at least sixty years old at the time of his death, placing his birth around 410 BC or earlier. His body is thought to have been placed in the Royal Kurgan, a burial mound where the previous Bosporan rulers had been interred, on the outskirts of Panticapaeum. Leucon's actions mirrored those of his grandfather, Spartocus I, who usurped the former Greek dynasty of the Bosporan state, as well as those of his father Satyrus. Leucon's descendants ruled the Bosporus for another two centuries, until Paerisades V died during a Scythian uprising.

== See also ==
- Cimmerian Bosporus
- List of Kings of Cimmerian Bosporus
- Sindi people
- Bosporan Kingdom

== Bibliography ==
- Aeneas Tacticus, Περὶ τοῦ πῶς χρὴ πολιορκουμένους ἀντέχειν (online edition here).
- Stanley M. Burstein (1974), "The War between Heraclea Pontica and Leucon I of Bosporus" Historia: Zeitschrift für Alte Geschichte. 4th Quarter. pp 401–416.
- Encyclopædia Britannica Academic Edition (2011) (online page here).
- Sergei R. Tokhtas'ev (2006), "The Bosporus and Sindike in the Era of Leukon I. New Epigraphic Publications" Ancient Civilizations from Scythia to Siberia. Volume 12 series 1-2, pp. 1–62
