= Hecataeus of the Sindi =

4th-century BC king of the Circassians

Hecataeus
- King of the Sindica Kingdom
- Reign: c. 405–379 BC
- Predecessor: Unknown
- Successor: Leucon I
- Born: Unknown; Sindica Kingdom
- Died: Unknown; Unknown
- Consort: Tirgatao; Unnamed daughter of Satyrus I
- Issue: Octamasades
- Greek: Ἑκαταίος
- House: Unknown
- Father: Unknown
- Mother: Unknown

Hecataeus (Ancient Greek: Ἑκαταίος, romanized: Hekataios) was the King of the Ancient Sintis (Sindis) throughout the reigns of both Satyrus I and Leucon I of the Bosporan Kingdom.

He was married to Tirgatao, a powerful Maeotian princess from the tribe of the Ixomatae and to a daughter of Satyrus.

He was also the father of Octamasades, who would later usurp the throne from his father, after which Leucon, seeing an opportunity to annex Sindike, waged war on Octamasades.

== Reign ==
Not much is known about Hecataeus' life or much of his reign, only that he, instead of killing Tirgatao on Satyrus' advice, locked her away in a castle in which she eventually got away from. Satyrus and Leucon searched for her, but she eluded them. She would wage war on both her former husband and Satyrus, forcing them to sue for peace.

== Losing the throne and abdication ==
Octamasades usurped the throne from his father, and then found himself in a war against Leucon. Leucon managed to drive Octamasades into Scythia after a single battle, in which Leucon reportedly said that he “made a vow to erect a victory monument, not to the local Apollo of Labrys, but to the supreme deity and patron of all the Bosporans, Apollo the Healer." Leucon then persuaded Hecataeus to resign the throne and give it to him instead. The Sindike kingdom became the Asiatic portion of the Bosporan Kingdom, which was subsequently inherited by Gorgippus.
