= Tirgatao =

4th-century BC queen of the Sindike Kingdom

- Queen of the Sindike Kingdom
- Reign: c.390-380 BCE
- Successor: ?
- Born: Unknown; Maeotian Marshes
- Spouse: Hecataeus; Unnamed Ixomatian ruler
- Issue: Octamasades

Tirgatao (Scythian: Tigratavā; Ancient Greek: Τιργαταώ, romanized: Tirgataṓ) was a princess of the Maeotes mentioned by Polyaenus. She was the first wife of the Sindian king Hecataeus, and was a notable participant of the Bosporan wars of expansion.

== Name ==
The name Tirgataō (Τιργαταώ) is the Hellenisation of the Scythian language name *Tigratavā, meaning "with the strength of an arrow."

== In the texts ==
Polyaenus tells us the story of Tirgatao in his book Stratagems:

Tirgatao of Maeotis married Hecataeus, king of the Sindi, a people who live a little above the Bosphorus.

Hecataeus was expelled from his kingdom, but was reinstated on his throne by Satyrus, tyrant of Bosphorus. Satyrus gave him his daughter in marriage, and urged him to kill his former wife. As Hecataeus passionately loved the Maeotian, he could not think of killing her, but confined her to a strong castle; however, she found a way of making her escape from there.

Fearing lest she should excite the Maeotians to war, Hecataeus and Satyrus made a strict search for her, which she skilfully eluded, travelling through lonely and deserted ways, hiding herself in the woods in the day, and continuing her journey in the night. At last she reached the country of the Ixomatae, where her own family possessed the throne. Her father was dead, and she afterwards married his successor in the kingdom.

Then she roused the Ixomatae to war, and engaged many warlike nations around the Maeotis to join the alliance. The confederates first invaded the country of Hecataeus, and afterwards ravaged the dominions of Satyrus. Harassed by a war, in which they found themselves inferior to the enemy, they sent an embassy to sue for peace, accompanied by Metrodorus the son of Satyrus, who was offered as a hostage. She granted them peace, on stipulated terms, which they bound themselves by oath to observe.

But no sooner had they made the oath, than they planned schemes to break it. Satyrus prevailed on two of his friends, to revolt to her, and put themselves under her protection; so as the more easily to find an opportunity to assassinate her. On their revolt, Satyrus wrote a letter, to ask for them to be handed over; which she answered, by alleging that the law of nations justified her in protecting those, who had placed themselves under her protection. The two men, who had revolted, one day requested an audience of her. While one distracted her with a pretended matter of importance, the other levelled a blow at her with a drawn sword, which fell upon her girdle; and the guards immediately seized and imprisoned them. They were afterwards examined by torture, and confessed the whole plot; upon which, Tirgatao ordered the hostage to be executed, and laid waste the territories of Satyrus with fire and sword. Stung with remorse for the calamities he had brought upon himself and his country, Satyrus died in the midst of an unsuccessful war; leaving his son Gorgippus [other sources say Leucon] to succeed him in the throne. He renounced his father's proceedings, and sued for peace, which she granted on payment of a tribute, and put an end to the war.

— Stratagems, 8.55.
