= Polyaenus =

2nd-century Roman Macedonian author and rhetorician

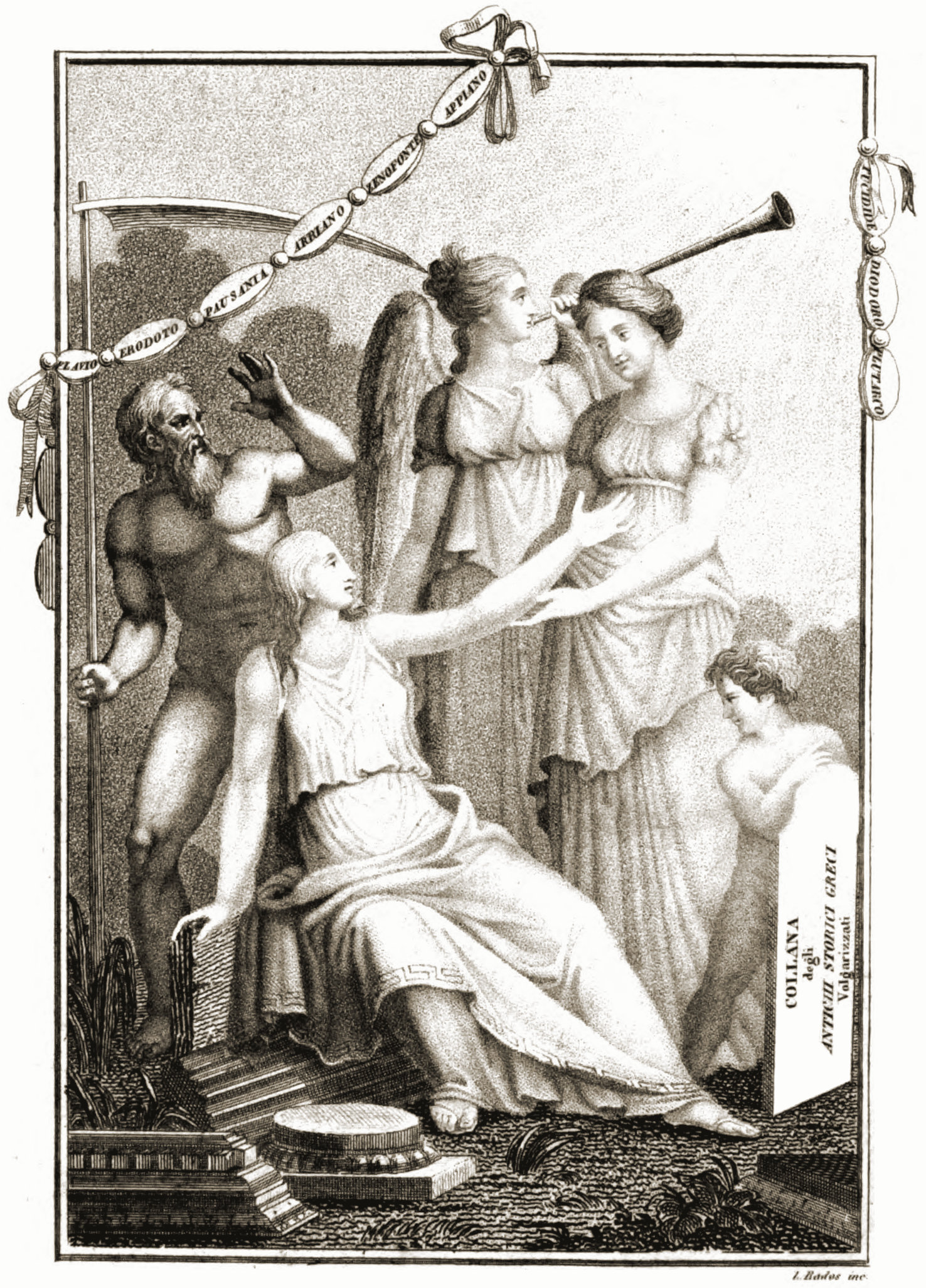
Polyaenus, Stratagems in War, 1821

Polyaenus or Polyenus (/ˌpɒliˈiːnəs/ POL-ee-EE-nəs; see ae (æ) vs. e; Ancient Greek: Πoλύαινoς, romanized: Polyainos, "much-praised") was a 2nd-century Roman Macedonian author and rhetorician, known best for his Stratagems in War (Ancient Greek: Στρατηγήματα, romanized: Strategemata), which has been preserved. The Suda calls him a rhetorician, and Polyaenus himself writes that he was accustomed to plead causes before the Roman emperor. Polyaenus dedicated Stratagems in War to the two emperors Marcus Aurelius (r. 161–180) and Lucius Verus (r. 161–169), while they were engaged in the Roman–Parthian War of 161–166, about 163, at which time he was too old to accompany them in their campaigns.

== Stratagems ==
This work is divided into eight books: the first six contain accounts of the stratagems of the most celebrated Greek generals and rulers, the seventh book contains stratagems of non Greeks and Romans, and the eighth book those of the Romans and of illustrious women. Parts, however, of the sixth and seventh books are lost, so that of the 900 stratagems which Polyaenus described, 833 have survived.

The book has survived in a single copy made in the 13th century, although there exist five abridged versions. The full copy once belonged to Michel Apostolios. It contains a vast number of anecdotes respecting many of the most celebrated men in antiquity, and has uniquely preserved many historical facts.

Polyaenus was first printed in a Latin translation, executed by Justus Vulteius, at Basel, 1549. The first edition of the Greek text was published by Isaac Casaubon, Lyon, 1589; the next by Pancratius Maasvicius, Leyden, 1690; the third by Samuel Mursinna, Berlin, 1756; the fourth by Adamantios Korais, Paris, 1809. The work has been translated into English by R. Shepherd, London, 1793; into German by Seybold, Frankfurt, 1793–94, and by Blume, Stuttgart, 1834.

== Other works ==
Polyaenus also wrote several other works, all of which have perished. The Suda has preserved the titles of two, On Thebes (Περὶ Θηβῶν) and Tactics, in three books (Τακτικά). Stobaeus makes a quotation from a work of Polyaenus, Ὑπὲρ τoῦ κoινoῦ τῶν Mακεδόνων (For the koinon of Macedonians), and from another entitled Ὑπὲρ τoῦ Συνεδρίoυ (For the Synedrion). Polyaenus likewise mentions his intention of writing a work on the memorable actions of M. Aurelius and L. Verus.
