= Satyrus I =

King of the Bosporan Kingdom from 432 to 389 BC

Satyros I
- King of the Bosporan Kingdom
- Reign: circa 432–389
- Predecessor: Spartocus I
- Successor: Gorgippus I and Leucon I
- Born: circa 470 BC; Panticapaeum
- Died: 389 BC (aged 81); Bosporan Kingdom
- Consort: Unknown
- Issue: Leucon I; Gorgippus I; Metrodoros; Unnamed daughter
- Greek: Σάτυρος
- House: Spartocid
- Father: Spartocus I
- Mother: Unknown
- Religion: Greek Polytheism

Satyrus I (Ancient Greek: Σάτυρος, romanized: Satyros, died 389 BC) was the Spartocid ruler of the Bosporan Kingdom from 432 BC to 389 BC. During his rule he built upon the expansive foreign policy of his father, Spartocus I. He conquered Nymphaion, became involved in the political developments of the neighbouring Sindike kingdom and laid siege to the city of Theodosia, which was a serious commercial rival because of its ice-free port and proximity to the grain fields of eastern Crimea.

He presided over a strengthening of ties with Athens, and at one point possibly had a statue raised in his honour in the city. He was also the father of Leucon and Gorgippus, who expanded their realm into a powerful kingdom.

== Reign ==
Satyrus I was a leading figure in the expansion of his father's kingdom, initially gaining some success by taking Nymphaeum from Gylon and perhaps Kimmerikon, but later had extensive problems with the neighbouring Sindike Kingdom, with which he had started an unsuccessful war, and the Greek city-states of Theodosia and Heraclea Pontica.

He allowed the son of his powerful minister Sopaeus to travel to Athens with two ships filled with wheat. Sopaeus' son's ships managed to avoid pirates and arrived at Athens. Once in Athens, his son met with the Athenian banker, Pasion, and managed to settle his affairs. Satyrus, however, came to the view that Sopaeus was involved in a conspiracy to take his life, so he had Sopaeus arrested. As Sopaeus's son was still in Athens, Satyrus ordered the Bosporans in Athens to confiscate the son's property and force him to return to the Bosporan Kingdom.

Afterwards Satyrus acquitted Sopaeus of his crimes and agreed to Sopaeus's daughter, Theodosia, marrying his son Leucon.

== Problems with the Sindi ==
Satyrus encountered extensive problems with the Sindi. According to Polyaenus, the problems arose because Satyrus I had offered his daughter to Hecactaeus, the king of the Sindi, but had instructed Hecactaeus to kill his existing wife, Tirgatao. Instead of killing her, Hecactaeus had her imprisoned in a tower, from which she was able to escape and reach her tribe, the Ixomatae. Tirgatao married her father's successor, her father presumably being king of the Ixomatae, and roused many tribes to make war against Satyrus. Satyrus, realising that he could not win, offered his son Metrodorus as a hostage and sued for peace.

Shortly after this, there was an attempt on Tirgatao's life, likely organized by Satyrus. After finding out about this scheme, Tirgatao had Metrodorus killed, and once again waged war on Satyrus. This war was ended by Leucon and Gorgippus shortly after their father's death and their ascent to the throne.

== Death and legacy ==
Satyrus died in the unsuccessful Siege of Theodosia in 389 BC at the age of 81, his death leading to the ascension to Leucon and Gorgippus, who expanded the Bosporan Kingdom.

== See also ==
- Cimmerian Bosporus
- List of Kings of Cimmerian Bosporus

== Bibliography ==
- Gaudukevich, V. F. (1979). "Bosporskoe tsarstvo". The Great Soviet Encyclopedia (3rd Edition).
- Trofimova, Anna A. (2007). Greeks on the Black Sea: ancient art from the Hermitage. Los Angeles, USA: Getty Publications. pp. 11–12. ISBN 978-0-89236-883-9.
- Dinarchus. Against Demosthenes. Cambridge MA (USA): Harvard University Press. p. 1.43.
- Gardiner-Garden, John R. (1986). "Fourth Century Conceptions of Maiotian Ethnography". Historia: Zeitschrift für Alte Geschichte. 35 (2): 193. JSTOR 4435962.
