= Nymphaion (Crimea) =

Ancient Greek colony in the Crimea

Nýmphaion
- Νύμφαιον; Nymphaeum; Нимфей
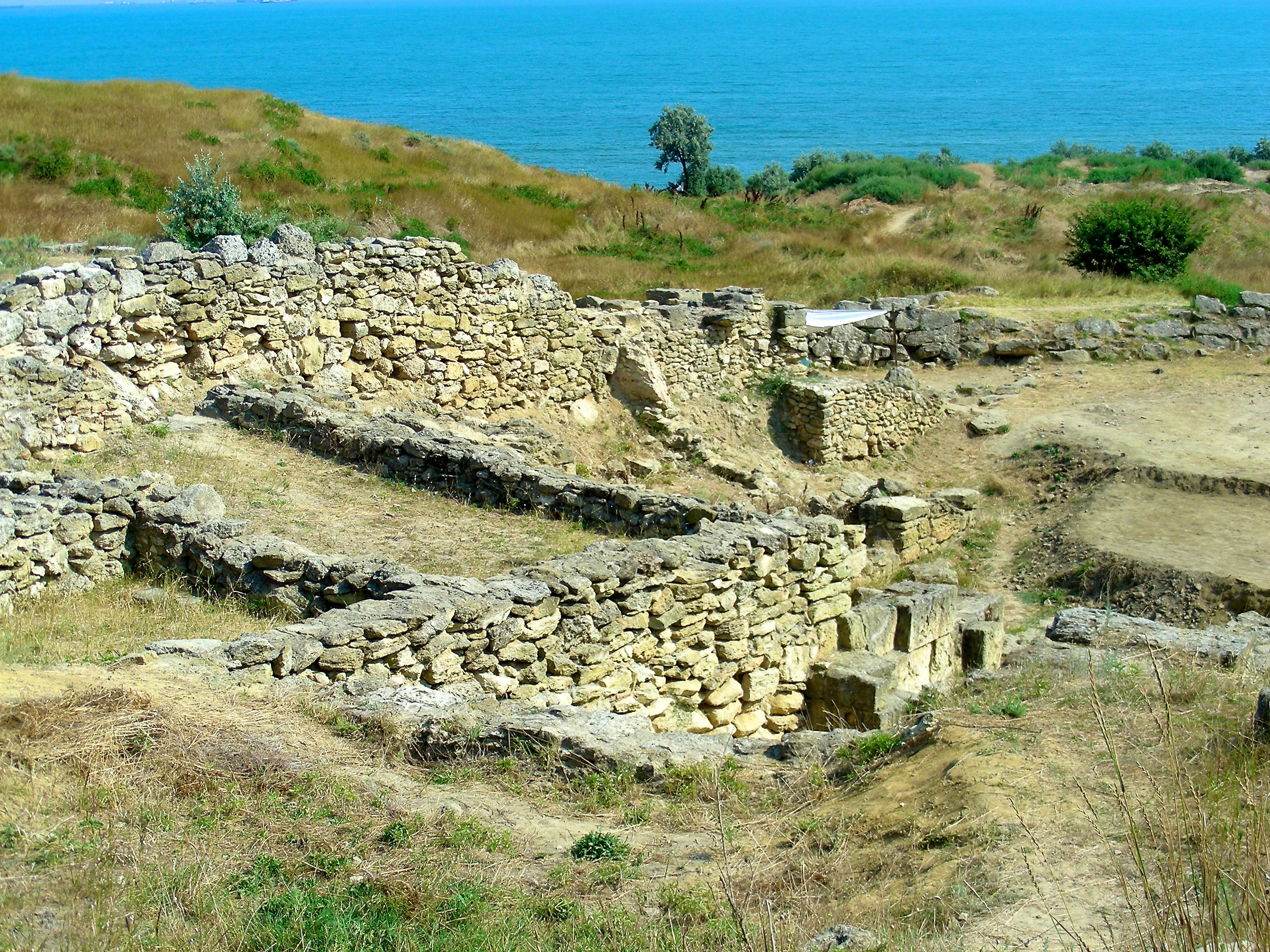
- Remains of excavated walls in Nýmphaion

- Location within Crimea
- 45°14′12″N 36°25′3″E
- Type: Settlement
- Location: Heroivske, Autonomous Republic of Crimea, Russia/Ukraine
- Region: Taurica

History
- Built: 580–560 BC
- Built by: Settlers from Samos

Immovable Monument of National Significance of Ukraine
- Official name: Археологічний комплекс "Стародавнє місто Німфей" (Archaeological complex of the Ancient city of Nymphaion)
- Type: Archaeology
- Reference no.: 010022-Н

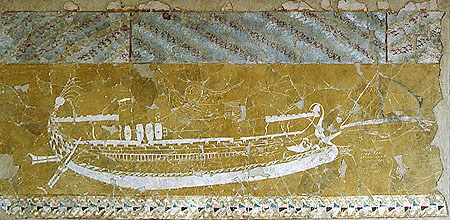
An image of a trireme on the wall of a temple in Nymphaion (3rd century BC).

Nymphaion and other ancient Greek colonies along the north coast of the Black Sea.

Nýmphaion (Greek: Νύμφαιον; Latin: Nymphaeum), also known as Nymphaion on the Pontus (Ancient Greek: Νύμφαιον τὸ ἐν τῷ Πόντῳ), was a significant centre of the Bosporan Kingdom, situated on the Crimean shore of the Cimmerian Bosporus. Today it is located near the resort town Heroivske. It lies at a distance of about 14 kilometers south of Kerch, which was the site of ancient Panticapaeum.

== Geography ==
The ruins of Nymphaion stand on a rocky cape approximately 200 meters west of the shoreline. Centuries of coastal erosion caused the shoreline to recede. The ancient shoreline would have been some 300 meters further east.

Today the ruins are bordered by the Čurubaš Lake to the north and the Tobečik Lake to the south. In ancient times both of these lakes were ravines with sea gulfs at their mouths in the east. These ravines were situated 7 kilometers apart. They enclosed a territory of more than 40 square kilometers further west, where a rocky ridge of steep hills bordered the area on the west.

These natural borders made the territory of Nymphaion more easily defendable. In addition, it is well suited to agriculture thanks to its fertile chernozem soil. It also receives 100 millimeters more rainfall than surrounding land.

== History ==
The city was founded by Greek colonists from Samos between 580 and 560 BC. There is no archaeological evidence for the presence of Scythians in the area before the city's founding. The town issued its own coins and generally prospered in the period of classical antiquity, when its citizens controlled cereal trade, which was vital for the well-being of mainland Greece. Athens chose it as its principal military base in the region ca. 444 BC and Gylon, the grandfather of Demosthenes, suffered banishment from Athens on charges that he had betrayed Nymphaeum during the Peloponnesian War. It was annexed to the Bosporan Kingdom by the end of the century.

During the Mithridatic Wars, the town allied with the Roman Republic and withstood a siege by the army of Pharnaces II of Pontus. It was at Phanagoria that the insurrection broke out against Mithridates VI of Pontus, shortly before his death; and his sons, who held the citadel, were obliged to surrender to the insurgents. An inscription found during excavations testifies that queen Dynamis honored Augustus as "the emperor, Caesar, son of god, the god Augustus, the overseer of every land and sea". The loyalty to Rome allowed Phanagoria to maintain a dominant position in the region until the 4th century, when it was sacked and destroyed by the invading Huns.

The site occupied a small hill by the sea. The acropolis contained the temples of Aphrodite (with several rooms) and of the Cabeiri. The lower terrace by the sea centred on the sanctuary of Demeter, first erected in the 6th century BC and several times rebuilt. Other ruins indicate that the town's architecture was unusually refined, perhaps the most sophisticated in the Bosporan Kingdom. One structure has no parallels in the Hellenistic world: it goes back to the 3rd century BC and is built of rose marl. The site also yielded a number of terracotta figurines, winemaking facilities (the oldest along the northern shore of the Black Sea) and several horse burials, associated with the Sarmatians.
