= Geographica =

Encyclopedia of geographical knowledge by Strabo

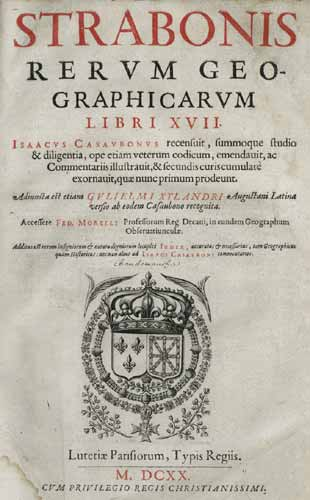
Title page of the 1620 edition of Isaac Casaubon's Geographica, whose 840 page numbers prefixed by "C" are now used as a standard text reference.

The Geographica (Ancient Greek: Γεωγραφικά, Geōgraphiká; Latin: Geographica or Strabonis Rerum Geographicarum Libri XVII, "Strabo's 17 Books on Geographical Topics") or Geography, is an encyclopedia of geographical knowledge, consisting of 17 books, written in Greek in the late first century BC, or early first century AD, and attributed to Strabo, an educated citizen of the Roman Empire of Greek descent. There is a fragmentary palimpsest dating to the fifth century. The earliest manuscripts of books 1–9 date to the tenth century, with a thirteenth-century manuscript containing the entire text.

== Title of the work ==
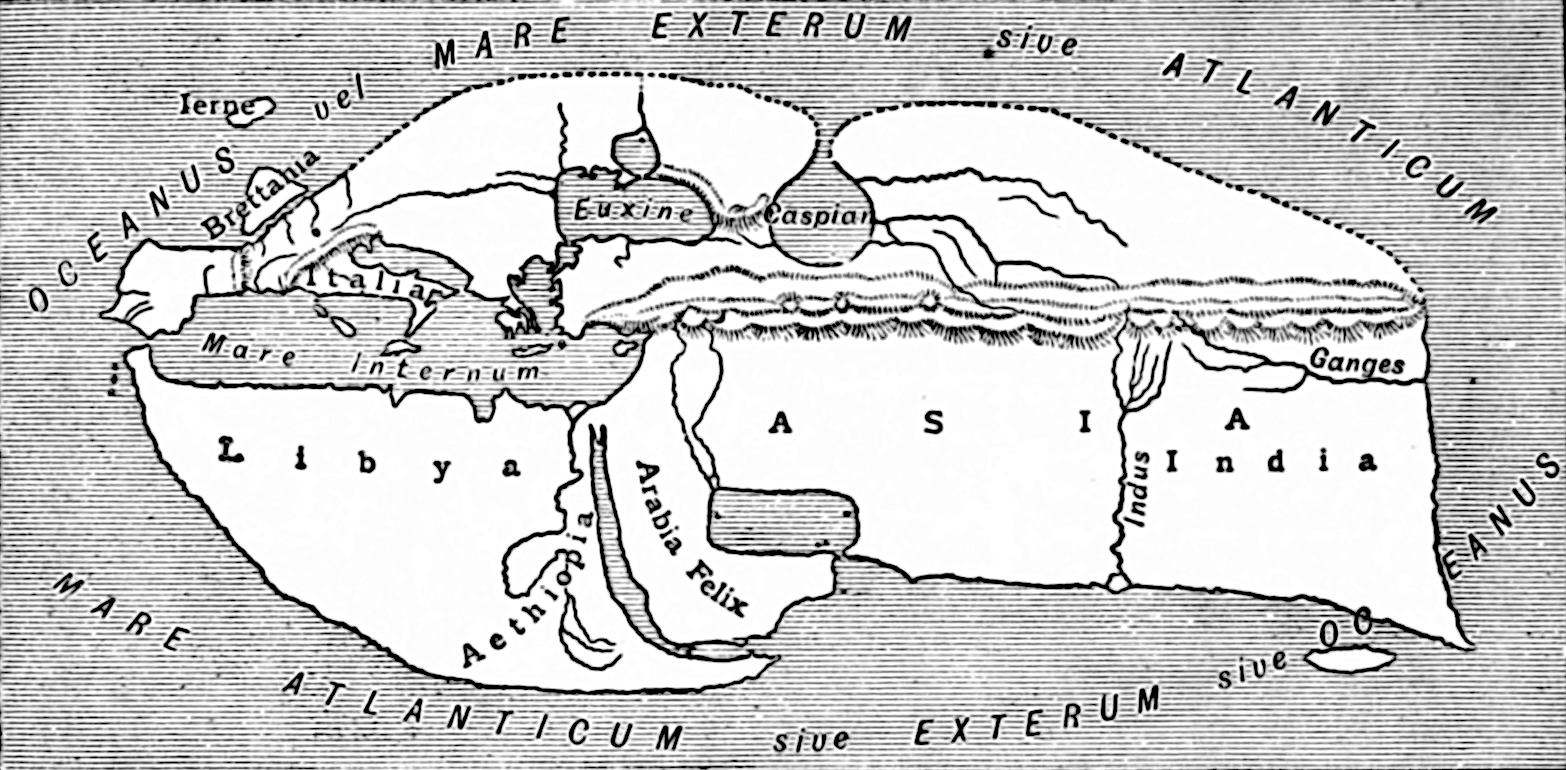
Map of the world according to Strabo

Strabo refers to his Geography within it by several names:

- geōgraphia, "description of the earth"
- chōrographia, "description of the land"
- periēgēsis, "an outline"
- periodos gēs, "circuit of the earth"
- periodeia tēs chōrās, "circuit of the land"

Said said:

It is the sea more than anything else that defines the contours of the land (geōgraphei) and gives it its shape, by forming gulfs, deep seas, straits and likewise isthmuses, peninsulas, and promontories; but both the rivers and the mountains assist the seas herein. It is through such natural features that we gain a clear conception of continents, nations, favourable positions of cities and all the other diversified details with which our geographical map (chorographikos pinax) is filled.

== Ascribed date ==
The date of Geographica is a large topic, perhaps because Strabo worked on it along with his History for most of his adult life. He traveled extensively, undoubtedly gathering notes, and made extended visits to Rome and Alexandria.

Strabo did not date his work and determining this has been a matter of scholarly study since the Renaissance. The earliest attempts were in the 16th and 17th centuries (such as the 1549 Basel edition and the 1571 Heidelberg edition) however the first serious attempt was by Johannes Fabricus in 1717.

Strabo visited Rome in 44 BC at age 19 or 20 apparently for purposes of education. He studied under various persons, including Tyrannion, a captive educated Greek and private tutor, who instructed Cicero's two sons. Cicero says:

The geographical work I had planned is a big undertaking...if I take Tyrannion's views too...

If one presumes that Strabo acquired the motivation for writing geography during his education, the latter must have been complete by the time of his next visit to Rome in 35 BC at 29 years old. He may have been gathering notes but the earliest indication that he must have been preparing them is his extended visit to Alexandria 25–20 BC. In 20 he was 44 years old. His "numerous excerpts" from "the works of his predecessors" are most likely to have been noted at the library there. Whether these hypothetical notes first found their way into his history and then into his geography or were simply ported along as notes remains unknown.

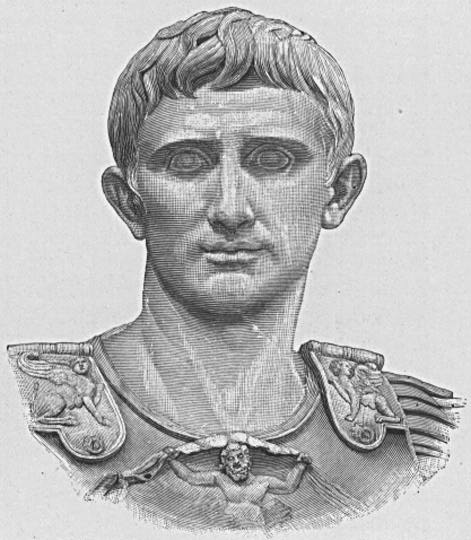
20th century drawing of Augustus

Most of the events of the life of Augustus mentioned by Strabo occurred 31–7 BC with a gap 6 BC – 14 AD, which can be interpreted as an interval after first publication in 7 BC. Then in 19 AD a specific reference dates a passage: he said that the Carni and Norici had been at peace since they were "stopped ... from their riotous incursions ...." by Drusus 33 years ago, which was 15 BC, dating the passage to the summer 19 AD. The latest event mentioned is the death of Juba at no later than 23 AD, when Strabo was in his 80s. These events can be interpreted as a second edition unless he saved all his notes and wrote the book entirely after the age of 80. Dueck concludes that the Geography was written between AD 18–24.

== Composition ==
Strabo is his own best proponent of his principles of composition:

In short, this book of mine should be ... useful alike to the statesman and to the public at large – as was my work on History. ... And so, after I had written my Historical Sketches ... I determined to write the present treatise also; for this work is based on the same plan, and is addressed to the same class of readers, and particularly to men of exalted stations in life. ... in this work also I must leave untouched what is petty and inconspicuous, and devote my attention to what is noble and great, and to what contains the practically useful, or memorable, or entertaining. ... For it, too, is a colossal work, in that it deals with the facts about large things only, and wholes ....

== Content ==
An outline of the encyclopedia follows, with links to the appropriate Wikipedia article.

=== Book I – definition and history of geography ===
Pages C1 through C67, Loeb Volume I pages 3–249.

==== Chapter 1 – description of geography and this encyclopedia ====
Book	Section	Description
I.1	1	Geography is a branch of philosophy.
I.1	2	Homer is the founder of geography.
I.1	3	The Ocean.
I.1	4	The Elysian Plain.
I.1	5	The Isles of the Blessed.
I.1	6	The Aethiopians, Definition of the Arctic Circle
I.1	7–9	Tides of the Ocean. Earth is an island.
I.1	10	The Mediterranean, the land of the Cimmerians, the Ister.
I.1	11	Anaximander and Hecataeus.
I.1	12	Hipparchus and the climata.
I.1	13	The antipodes.
I.1	14–19	The ecumene. Geography requires encyclopedic knowledge of celestial, terrestrial and maritime features as well as natural history and mathematics and is of strategic interest.
I.1	20	Earth is a sphere with surface curved by the law of gravity, that bodies move to the center.
I.1	21	Knowledge of geometry is required to understand geography.
I.1	22–23	The purpose and plan of the encyclopedia.

==== Chapter 2 – contributors to geography ====
Book	Section	Description
I.2	1	Contributions of the Romans and Parthians to geography
I.2	2–3	Critique of Eratosthenes
I.2	4–40	Critique of Homer's and the other poets' geography and various writers' view of it, especially Eratosthenes'.

==== Chapter 3 – physical geography ====
Book	Section	Description
I.3	1–2	Critiques of Eratosthenes' sources: Damastes, Euhemerus.
I.3	3	Critiques of Eratosthenes' geology, shape of the Earth.
I.3	4–7	Fossils, formation of the seas.
I.3	8–9	Silting.
I.3	10	Volcanic action.
I.3	11–12	Currents.
I.3	13–15	More on the formation of the seas.
I.3	16–20	Island-building, earthquakes
I.3	21	Human migration.
I.3	22–23	Hyperboreans, Hypernotians

==== Chapter 4 – political geography ====
Book	Section	Description
I.4	1	Heaven is spherical corresponding to Earth's sphericity.
I.4	2–6	Distances along lines of latitude and longitude to various peoples and places.
I.4	7–8	The three continents: Europe, Asia, Libya.
I.4	9	Recommends Alexander the Great's division of people into good or bad rather than the traditional Greek barbarians and Greeks.

=== Book II – mathematics of geography ===
Pages C67 through C136, Loeb Volume I pages 252–521.

==== Chapter 1 – distances between parallels and meridians ====
Book	Section	Description
II.1	1–3	Relates Eratosthenes' description of the Tropic of Cancer, which was based on Patrocles.
II.1	4–5	Critiques Hipparchus' criticism of Patrocles, which was based on Deimachus and Megasthenes. Points out that Eratosthenes used the Library of Alexandria.
II.1	6–8	Critique of Patrocles.
II.1	9	Fabrications of the geographers concerning India.
II.1	10–41	Calculations of distances between parallels and meridians passing through various places in the habitable world, according to various geographers: Hipparchus, Eratosthenes, Pytheas, Deimachus.

==== Chapter 2 – the five zones ====
Book	Section	Description
II.2	1	Introduces the work Oceans by Poseidonius.
II.2	2–3	Critiques Poseidonius, who criticises Parmenides and Aristotle on the widths and locations of the five zones.

==== Chapter 3 – distribution of plants, animals, civilizations ====
Book	Section	Description
II.3	1–3	Critiques the six zones of Polybius.
II.3	4	Describes African voyages: the circumnavigation by an expedition sent by Necho II, another by Magus; to India by Eudoxus of Cyzicus.
II.3	5	Adventures and misadventures of Eudoxus. Attacks the credibility of Pytheas, Euhemerus, Antiphanes.
II.3	6	Poseidonius' theory of Atlantis; attributes migration of Cimbri to inundation.
II.3	7	Attributes the distribution of plants, animals and civilizations to chance (suntuchia) rather than to zones (which was Poseidonius' theory).
II.3	8	Example of random racial distribution: Ethiopians were in both Asia (India) and Libya (Africa). Strabo says his school avoids such causal connections.

==== Chapter 4 – criticisms of Polybius' and Eratosthenes' maps ====
Book	Section	Description
II.4	1–2	Polybius' critique of Pytheas.
II.4	3	Strabo's criticisms of Polybius' European distances.
II.4	4	Strabo's criticisms of Polybius' critique of the distances of Eratosthenes.
II.4	5–6	Strabo's corrections to various geographers' descriptions of the locations of the Tanaïs, the Tyras, the Borysthenes and the Hypanis.
II.4	7	Strabo criticises Polybius' length of the inhabited world.
II.4	8	Strabo criticises Polybius' and Eratosthenes' physical divisions of Europe.

==== Chapter 5 – Strabo's view of the ecumene ====
Book	Section	Description
II.5	1	Representation of a spherical surface as a plane requires the geographer to be a mathematician.
II.5	2	The celestial sphere, gravity, the Earth's axis and the poles, stellar paths, equator, tropics, arctic circles, ecliptic, zodiac.
II.5	3	The five zones, terrestrial and celestial, the hemispheres, the ocean.
II.5	4	The gnomon, latitude, longitude, circumference of the Earth.
II.5	5–6	The inhabited world is an island shaped like a truncated cone, in a spherical quadrilateral formed between the equator, the arctic circle and a great circle passing through the poles. The island is 70,000 stadia long by 30,000 stadia wide.
II.5	7	Hipparchus says the equator is 252,000 stadia long; the great circle distance from equator to pole is 63,000 stadia.
II.5	8	Strabo does not believe Pytheas that Thule is farthest north at the Arctic Circle. He thinks no one is north of Ierne. He believes the Romans scorned to invade Britain as being worthless.
II.5	9	The length and width of the inhabited world are 70,000 and 30,000 stadia respectively.
II.5	10	Strabo recommends representing the Earth on a globe of no less than 10 feet in diameter or on a plane map of at least 7 feet.
II.5	11–12	Strabo says he personally travelled from Armenia to Tyrrhenia and from the Euxine Sea to the frontiers of Ethiopia. He and all other geographers receive information mostly by hearsay. He went up the Nile river with his friend Aelius Gallus, prefect of Egypt, to the edge of Ethiopia and Syene.
II.5	13–16	The known limits of the Earth are Meroe in the Nile river, Ierne, the Sacred Promontory beyond the Pillars of Hercules and east of Bactriana.
II.5	17–18	The sea determines the contours of the land. The four largest internal seas are the Caspian sea, the Persian Gulf, the Red Sea and the Mediterranean Sea.
II.5	19–25	Mediterranean Sea.
II.5	26	The continents are Europe, Libya, Asia. Europe develops excellence in men and government and has contributed the most to the others.
II.5	27–33	States the locations of the countries of the three continents.
II.5	34	Division of the circumference of the Earth, which is 252,000 stadia, by 360 gives 700 stadia per section.
II.5	35–43	Equator, Tropic circle, Arctic Circle, latitude by the shadow of the gnomon and the length of the longest day.

=== Book III – Iberian peninsula ===
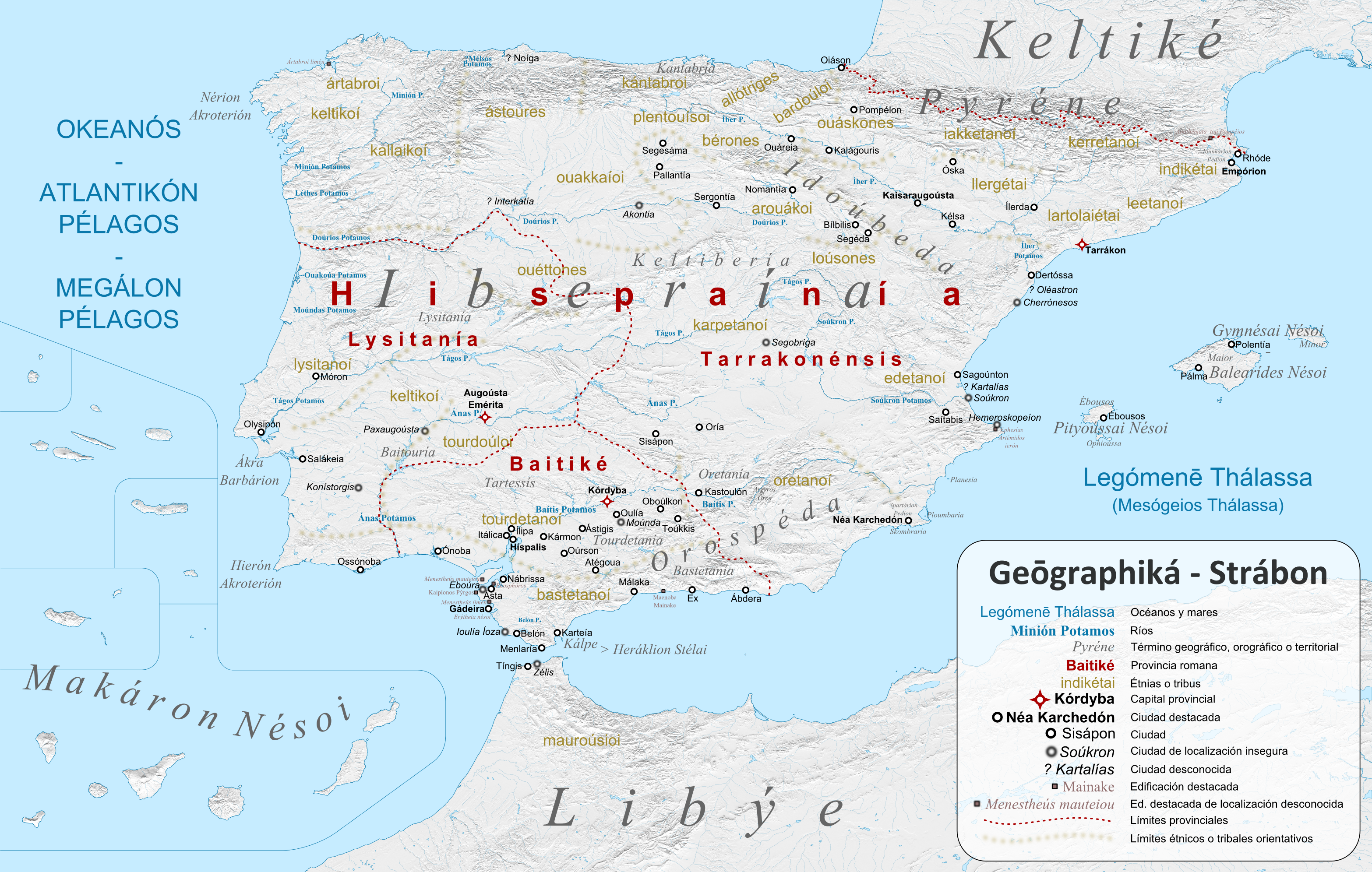
Representation on a modern map of Iberia according to Strabo.

==== Chapter 1 – Vicinity of the Sacred Cape ====
Book	Section	Description
III.1	1–3	Ibēria is poor, inhospitable and mountainous, 6000 stadia N–S, 5000 E–W. The Purēnē oros is aligned N–S and separates Ibēria from Keltikē.
III.1	4	The Sacred Cape is the westernmost point of the inhabited world. The country next to it is called Cuneus, "wedge", in the Latin language from its shape. It is occupied by the Ibēres across the straits from the Maurousioi.
III.1	5	Strabo repeats Poseidonius' assertion that the setting sun is larger at the coast because of a lens effect through the water vapor. He says Artemidorus is wrong in claiming a size of 100 times larger and that he could not have seen it because the cape was taboo at night.
III.1	6	South West Iberia is delimited by the Tagus river (to the north of the Sacred Cape) and the Anas river to the east. The region is populated by the Keltikoi and some Lusitanai resettled there from beyond the Tagus by the Romans. Inland are the Karpētanoi (Madrid region), the Ōrētanoi (La Mancha and eastern Sierra Morena, and the Ouettōnoi (Salamanca region). The fertile southeast, Baetica (Andalusia region), east of the Baetis river after which it is named, is occupied by the Tourdētanoi or Tourdouloi, who have writing and a literature. Other Iberians have alphabets, but not the same, as they do not all use the same languages (glōttai).

==== Chapter 2 – Bætica ====
Book	Section	Description
III.2	1–2	Bætica is the region around the Bætis river, main cities are Corduba and Gadira.
III.2	3–5	Bætis river is navigable and boats go from the sea to Corduba.
III.2	6	Bætica soil is fertile, it exports a lot of wheat, wine, and oil.
III.2	7	Bætica littoral is full of fish, especially fat tuna, which eat a lot of acorns like some "sea pigs".
III.2	8	Bætica subsoil is full of gold, silver, cooper, and iron.
III.2	9–10	How gold and silver are extracted from the soil of Baetica and other regions of Hispania.
III.2	11–13	What Homer says about Bætica.
III.2	14–15	Bætica was a Phœnician colony, now it's romanised.

==== Chapter 3 Iberia ====
Book	Section	Description
III
III	1	Topography of Iberia
III	2	Turdetani
III	3	North West Spain discussed
III	4	Seacoast from the Strait of Gibraltar to the Pyrenees & inland
III	5	Islands of Iberia
III	6	
III	7	
III	8	

==== Chapter 4 ====
Book	Section	Description
III	1–20	...

==== Chapter 5 - Islands of Iberia: Baleares, Cassiterides, Gades ====
Book	Section	Description
III	1	Balearic Islands
III	2	Balearic Islands cont.
III	3	Gades
III	4	Mythical Erytheia location
III	5	Myths about the Pillars of Heracles
III	6	Pillars of Heracles cibt
III	7	Water and tides and Gades
III	8	Water and tides and Gades cont.
III	9	Seleucus in Gades.
III	10	Story by Poseidonius of a tree found in Gades
III	11	Cassiterides

=== Book IV – Gaul, Britain, Ireland, Thule, the Alps ===
==== Chapter 1 – Narbonitis ====
Book	Section	Description
IV	1	'Celtica beyond the Alps' (Gaul), its inhabitants and boundaries
IV	2	The agriculture and landscapes of Gaul
IV	3	The cities and towns of Narbonitis
IV	4	The cult of Ephesian Artemis in Massalia (Marseille)
IV	5	The government and society of Massalia, its interactions with Rome, and the founding of Aquae Sextiae (Aix)
IV	6	The coastline around Massalia, including the Galactic Gulf; the site and trade of Narbo (Narbonne)
IV	7	The mysterious rocks of the Stony Plain, and the causes given by other writers
IV	8	Siltation and oyster-fishing in the mouth of the Rhodanus (Rhône)
IV	9	The remaining settlements of the coastline, including Forum Iulium (Fréjus), Nicaea (Nice) and Antipolis (Antibes)
IV	10	The Stoechades Islands (Îles d’Hyères) and other coastal islands
IV	11	The towns and rivers of the Cévennes and the Rhône basin as far as Lemenna (lac Léman), including Avenio (Avignon), Arausio (Orange) and Vienna (Vienne)
IV	12	The right bank of the Rhône, including Nemausos (Nîmes)
IV	13	Historical migration from Gaul to Cappadocia
IV	14	Tolossa (Toulouse) and river trade in Gaul

==== Chapter 2 – Aquitania ====
Book	Section	Description
IV	1	The geography of Aquitania, between the Pyrenees and the Liger (Loire) via the Garumna (Garonne)
IV	2	The inhabitants of Aquitania
IV	3	The history of Vercingetorix and the Arverni, including the settlements of Cenabum (Orléans), Gergovia (Gergovie) and Alesia (Alise-Sainte-Reine)

==== Chapter 3 – Celtica ====
Book	Section	Description
IV	1	Description of the interior of Celtica (Gaul), between the Rhenus (Rhine) Rhodanus (Rhône) and Liger (Loire)
IV	2	Lugdunum (Lyon), one of the most important cities in Gaul, and of local tribes and peoples (including the Aedui and the Sequani)
IV	3	Description of the Rhine and a calculation of its length; an account of Julius Caesar's actions along the river during the Gallic Wars
IV	4	The territory of the Helvetii and the other peoples of the Rhine, including Germanic tribes and settlers (such as the Treveri, Nervii and Suebi)
IV	5	Northern Gaul, including Durocortorum (Reims), the Ardouenna (Ardennes) and the Parisii in Lucotocia (Lutetia)

==== Chapter 4 – Northwest Gaul and the Belgae ====
Book	Section	Description
IV	1	The coastal tribes (the Veneti and the Osismii)
IV	2	A general ethnography of the Gauls
IV	3	The tribes of the Belgae and their characteristics
IV	4	Description of the three intellectual classes of the Belgae (the bards, vates and druids)
IV	5	The habits of the Belgae, including their fondness for jewellery, practice of scalping and religious sacrifice of humans
IV	6	Description of an island near the mouth of the Loire, home to a Dionysiac cult and inhabited entirely by women

==== Chapter 5 – Great Britain, Ireland, and other islands ====
Book	Section	Description
IV	1	The island of Great Britain and its dimensions
IV	2	The natural resources and inhabitants of Great Britain
IV	3	Roman attempts at the occupation of Great Britain
IV	4	Ireland and its inhabitants
IV	5	Thule

==== Chapter 6 – The Alps ====
Book	Section	Description
IV	1	
IV	2	
IV	3	
IV	4	
IV	5	
IV	6	
IV	7	
IV	8	
IV	9	
IV	10	
IV	11	
IV	12	

=== Book V – Italy to Campania ===
==== Chapter 1 – Northern Italy ====
Book	Section	Description
V	1	The shape of Italy, its geography, and the rivers and cities of the north; the River Padus (Po), Mediolanum (Milan), Comum (Como), Patavium (Padua), and Ravenna
V	2	The places of northwestern Italy, including the River Tiber, the quarry at Carrara, Pisa, and the islands of Elba, Corsica and Sardinia; also ethnographies of Italian peoples, including the Tyrrhenians (Etruscans), the Caeretanians, and the mysterious Pelasgians.
V	3	
V	4	
V	5	
V	6	
V	7	
V	8	
V	9	
V	10	
V	11	
V	12	

==== Chapter 2 – Tuscany and Umbria ====
Book	Section	Description
V	1	
V	2	
V	3	
V	4	
V	5	
V	6	
V	7	
V	8	
V	9	
V	10	

==== Chapter 3 – The Sabine Hills and Latium ====
Book	Section	Description
V	1	
V	2	
V	3	
V	4	
V	5	
V	6	
V	7	
V	8	
V	9	
V	10	
V	11	
V	12	
V	13	

==== Chapter 4 – Picenum and Campania ====
Book	Section	Description
V	1	
V	2	
V	3	
V	4	
V	5	
V	6	
V	7	
V	8	
V	9	
V	10	
V	11	
V	12	
V	13	

=== Book VI – south Italy, Sicily ===
==== Chapter 1 – Southern Italy ====
Book	Section	Description
VI	1	
VI	2	
VI	3	
VI	4	
VI	5	
VI	6	
VI	7	
VI	8	
VI	9	
VI	10	
VI	11	
VI	12	
VI	13	
VI	14	
VI	15	

==== Chapter 2 – Sicily ====
Book	Section	Description
VI	1	
VI	2	
VI	3	
VI	4	
VI	5	
VI	6	
VI	7	
VI	8	
VI	9	
VI	10	
VI	11	

==== Chapter 3 – Greece ====
Book	Section	Description
VI	1	
VI	2	
VI	3	
VI	4	
VI	5	
VI	6	
VI	7	
VI	8	
VI	9	
VI	10	
VI	11	

==== Chapter 4 – Italy summary ====
Book	Section	Description
VI	1	
VI	2	

=== Book VII – north, east and central Europe ===
==== Chapter 1 – Germania ====
Book	Section	Description
VII	1	Overview of the lands to be covered in the rest of the text.
VII	2	Germanic peoples.
VII	3	Geography of Germania, list of Germanic tribes.
VII	4	Roman conflicts with Germans.
VII	5	The Hercynian Forest, the Ister river.

==== Chapter 2 – Germania ====
Book	Section	Description
VII	1	Correcting false tales of the Cimbri.
VII	2	Cimbri raids.
VII	3	Cimbri divination.
VII	4	Lack of knowledge of areas beyond Germany.

==== Chapter 3 – northern Black Sea region ====
Book	Section	Description
VII	1	Southern Germania, myths about distant regions.
VII	2	The Mysians.
VII	3	Mysian culture and religion.
VII	4	Getae. Different views of their culture.
VII	5	Zalmoxis, his travels, and his influence on the Mysians.
VII	6	Errors in other Greek accounts of Mysia.
VII	7–10	The Scythians.
VII	11–12	The Getae.
VII	13–19	Danube river, Dacians, Thracians, Peucini, Dniester river, Dnepr river, Roxolani.

==== Chapter 4 – Crimea ====
Book	Section	Description
VII	1–8	Crimea

==== Chapter 5 – Illyria and Pannonia ====
Book	Section	Description
VII	1–12	Countries along the west bank of the Danube.

==== Chapter 6 – Eastern Dacia and Thrace ====
Book	Section	Description
VII	1–2	Continuation of countries along the western and southern banks of the Danube (the Balkans).

==== Chapter 7 – Epirus ====
Book	Section	Description
VII	1–2	Continuation on the Balkans.

=== Book VIII – Greece ===
Book	Section	Description
VIII	1.1	Summary of previous chapters and intro to Greece
VIII	1.2	Greek tribes and dialects, Origins thereof
VIII	1.3	Topography – coastline and peninsulas
VIII	3.9	Epeians and Eleians peoples
VIII	3.12	Temples and Shrines to various gods
VIII	3.17	Cauconians, Origins thereof
VIII	3.30	Olympia, legends thereof
VIII	4.11	Depopulation of Laconia (area around Sparta)

=== Book X – Yet more on Greece, Greek islands ===
==== Chapter 1 – Euboea ====
Book	Section	Description
X	1	
X	2	
X	3	
X	4	
X	5	
X	6	
X	7	
X	8	
X	9	
X	10	
X	11	
X	12	
X	13	
X	14	
X	15	
X	16	

=== Book XI – Russia east of the Don, the Transcaucasus, northwest Iran, Central Asia ===
==== Chapter 1 – East of the Don ====
Book	Section	Description
XI	1	Brief Description of Asia
XI	2	The Taurus Mountains
XI	3	Measurements of the Taurus Mountains
XI	4	Brief overview of nations bordering the Taurus mountains
XI	5	The Don River, Sea of Azov, Strait of Kerch, Strait of Zabache, Kura, and Arax rivers
XI	6	Brief description of Pompey's expedition
XI	7	The Caspian Sea, Gates of Alexander, and Halys River

==== Chapter 2 - Sarmatia ====
Book	Section	Description
XI	1	The Sarmatians, Aorsi, Siraci, Moeotae, Achaei, Zygii, Heniochi, Cercetae, and Macropogones
XI	3	The city of Tanais
XI	4	The Maeotae and geography around Tanais
XI	5	The Cimmerians and the city of Cimmericum
XI	7	Monument of Satyrus
XI	8	The villages of Patraeus, Corocondame, and Acra
XI	9	Corocondametis Lake and the Kuban Rivers
XI	10	Phanagoria
XI	11	The Sindi, Dandarii, Toreatae, Agri, Arrhechi, Tarpetes, Obidiaceni, Sittaceni, Dosci, and Maeotae
XI	12-13	The Achae, Zygii, and Heniochi
XI	14	Geography of Colchis
XI	15	Geography of the North Caucasus
XI	16	Phasis
XI	17	Colchis
XI	18	The Argonauts and Mithridates
XI	19	The Soanes

==== Chapter 3 – Iberia ====
Book	Section	Description
XI	1	Description of Caucasian Iberia
XI	2	The Kura, Araks, Alazan, Sandobanes, Rhoetaces, and Chanes Rivers
XI	3	Occupation of lowland and highland Iberians
XI	4—5	Entry into Iberia
XI	6	Social hierarchy of Iberia

==== Chapter 4 – Albania ====
Book	Section	Description
XI.2	1	The Caucasian Albanians
XI.2	2	The Kura River
XI.2	3	Agriculture of Caucasian Albania
XI.2	4	Features of Caucasian Albanians
XI.2	5	Military of Caucasian Albania, The Caspians, and entry into Caucasian Albania
XI.2	6	Rulership and fauna of Caucasian Albania
XI.2	7	Religion of Caucasian Albania
XI.2	8	Traditions of Caucasian Albania

==== Chapter 5 – The Caucasus ====
Book	Section	Description
XI	1	The Amazons, Gargareans, Legae, and Gelae
XI	2	The Mermodas River
XI	3—4	Achievements of the Amazons
XI	5	?
XI	6	Highest point of the Caucasus
XI	7	The Troglodytae, Chamaecoets, and Polyphagi
XI	8	The Siraces and Aorsi

==== Chapter 6 - The Caspian ====
Book	Section	Description
XI	1	The Caspian Sea
XI	2	The Sacae and Massagetae
XI	3—4	Criticisms of historical authors

==== Chapter 7 - East of the Caspian ====
Book	Section	Description
XI	1	The Dahae and other Scythian nomads
XI	2	Hyrcania
XI	3	The Ochus and Oxus Rivers
XI	4	?
XI	5	?

==== Chapter 8 - Geography of the Caspian and Iran ====
Book	Section	Description
XI	1	Geography of the Caspian Sea
XI	2	The Bactrians, Asii, Pasiani, Tochari, Sacaruli, Dahae, Sacae, and Massagetae
XI	3	Geography of the Iranian Desert
XI	4—5	The Sacae
XI	6—7	The Massagetae
XI	8	More about the Scythian tribes
XI	9	Measurements between locations in Scythia

==== Chapter 9 – Parthia ====
Book	Section	Description
XI	1	Parthia
XI	2—3	History of Parthia

==== Chapter 10 – Aria and Margiana ====
Book	Section	Description
XI	1	Aria, Drangiana, Margiana, and Arachosia
XI	2	Margiana

==== Chapter 11 – Bactria ====
Book	Section	Description
XI	1	Bactria
XI	2	Cities of Bactria
XI	3	The Bactrians and Sogdians
XI	4	Cities created and destroyed by Alexander
XI	5	Rivers of Sogdiana and Bactria
XI	6	Alexander's planned expedition to Sogdiana
XI	7—12	Measurements of the region

==== Chapter 12 - The Taurus Mountains ====
Book	Section	Description
XI	1	Geography of the Taurus Mountains

==== Chapter 13 - Media ====
Book	Section	Description
XI	1	Media
XI	2	Atropatene
XI	3	The summer palace in Ganzaka
XI	4	The Cadusii
XI	6—7	Geography of Media
XI	8	Tributes of Medes
XI	9—11	Traditions of the Medes

==== Chapter 14 - Armenia ====
Book	Section	Description
XI	1—2	Armenia
XI	3	Arax River
XI	4	Geography of Armenia
XI	5	Growth of Armenia
XI	6	Artaxata
XI	7	Rivers of Armenia
XI	8	Lakes of Armenia
XI	9	Mines and Cavalry of Armenia
XI	10	Pompey and Tigranes
XI	11	Measurements of Armenia
XI	12—13	Strabo's account of the origin of the Armenians
XI	14	Tribes near Armenia
XI	15	Brief history of Armenia
XI	16	Religion of Armenia

=== Book XII – Anatolia ===
==== Chapter 3 – Pontus ====
Book	Section	Description
XII	1	The kingdom of Mithridates Eupator
XII	3	Bithynians
XII	5	Caucones whose domain extended from Mariandynia to the river Parthenius
XII	6	The city of Heracleia
XII	7	Rivers between Chalcedon and Heracleia
XII	15	The plain of Themiscyra
XII	16	The plain of Sidene
XII	32	Pontic Comana

==== Chapter 4 – Bithynia ====
Book	Section	Description
XII	1	Surroundings of Bithynia on all four sides
XII	2	Geography of the region south of Bithynia. The Astacene Gulf and the role of Bithynian kings in its history.
XII	4	On the difficulty of marking the boundaries between the territories of the Bithynians, Phrygians and Mysians.

==== Chapter 8 – Phrygia ====
Book	Section	Description
XII	1	Phrygia, Mysia, and Bithynia, and the parts of Phrygia and Mysia
XII	2	Debate as to whether the district around Sipylus is part of Greater of Lesser Phrygia
XII	3	Lydians and other peoples

=== Book XIII – northern Aegean ===
==== Chapter 1 – Troad ====
Book	Section	Description
XII	1	Preamble to the region of the Troad with a brief discussion of sources, especially Homer
XII	2	Regions of the Troad

=== Book XIV – eastern Aegean ===
==== Chapter 2 – Asia Minor ====
Book	Section	Description
XIV	5–13	Description of Rhodes. Commentary of the people, politics, and society of Rhodes. Includes description of the fallen Colossus of Rhodes.

=== Book XVI – Middle East ===
==== Chapter 1 – Assyria ====
Book	Section	Description
XVI	1—2	Assyria geographical extent.
XVI	4	Nineveh.
XVI	5—6	Babylon.
XVI	7	Borsippa.
XVI	8—9	Geography of Babylon
XVI	10	Canal Maintenance.
XVI	11	Aristobulus on Alexander.
XVI	12	Eratosthenes and hydrology.
XVI	13	Polycleitus and hydrology.
XVI	14	Babylonia production of resources
XVI	15	Asphaltus in Babylonia and its uses
XVI	16	Babylonia entyonym
XVI	17	Artemita and Persis
XVI	22–23	Cossaei, Paraetacene, Elymais

==== Chapter 2 – Syria ====
Book	Section	Description
XVI	1-2	Syria geography.
XVI	3	General description Syria.
XVI	4—5	Cities of the Seleucis of Syria.
XVI	6	Rablah
XVI	7	Orontes River.
XVI	8	Regions of Syria.
XVI	9	Laodicea in Syria.
XVI	10	Apamea, Syria.
XVI	11	Parapotamia.
XVI	12	Laodiceia and the coast
XVI	13	Arwad
XVI	14	Aradii
XVI	15	Tyre, Sidon, and Aradus.
XVI	16	Mountains and Rivers of Syria.
XVI	17	Macras
XVI	18	Massyas
XVI	19	Abraham River
XVI	20	Damascus
XVI	21	Borders of Coele-Syria
XVI	22	Borders of Phoenicia
XVI	23	Tyre
XVI	24	Sidon
XVI	25—26	Acre
XVI	27	Caesarea Maritima
XVI	28	Jaffa
XVI	29	Tel Ashkelon
XVI	30	Gaza City
XVI	31	Raphia
XVI	33	Sinai and Negev
XVI	34	Judea and environs
XVI	35—37	Origins of the Jews
XVI	38—39	Relating Judaism to Stoicism
XVI	40	History of the Jews
XVI	41	Jericho
XVI	42—45	Dead Sea and environs
XVI	46	History of the Jews

==== Chapter 3 – Persian Gulf ====
Book	Section	Description
XVI	1—5	Persian Gulf description.
XVI	6	General description Red Sea.
XVI	7	Persian Gulf.

==== Chapter 4 – Arabia ====
Book	Section	Description
XVI	1	Arabia description from Eratosthenes.
XVI	2—3	Nabatea, Sabæans, and other nations
XVI	4—8	Shores of Arabia & Africa
XVI	9—16	Africa
XVI	17—18	Troglodytae
XVI	19	Sabeans
XVI	20	Red Sea
XVI	21	Nabataea
XVI	22—24	History of the Romans in Arabia
XVI	25	Discussion of aromatic plants and Arabian people's culture
XVI	26	Nabataeans

=== Book XVII – North Africa ===
==== Chapter 1 – Nile, Egypt, Cyrenaica ====
Book	Section	Description
17	1–2	Eratosthenes on the Nile and surrounding people
17	3	The Nile in Ethiopia. The organization of Egypt, nomes, classes, comments on the Labyrinth.
17	4	The Nile in the Nile Delta
17	5	Source of the Nile. Greek writers about the Nile. Definition of the name Aegypt.
17	6	Harbours of Alexandria, Pharos Island. Julius Caesar. Founding of the city by Alexander the Great.
17	7	Importance of Alexandria. Lake Mareotis
17	8	Details about Alexandria. Ptolemy I Soter steals Alexanders body. Perdiccas is slain. Roxana departes for Macedonia.
17	9	Lighthouse of Alexandria. Other temples and buildings, Lochias (promontory), Royal palace, Antirrhodos (island), Theatre, Poseidium, Emporium, Timonium, Caesarium, Heptastadium.
17	10	More details about Alexandria. More buildings and structures. The Sarapium. Emperor Augustus defeats Mark Antony.
17	11	The Ptolemaic dynasty
17	12–13	Egypt as a Roman province. Roman Legions. Polybius' visit to Alexandria.
17	14	Coastal cities from Cyrenaica to Alexandria. About wine.
17	15	Papyrus, Cyperus and Cyperus papyrus in the Deltaic marshes and lakes.
17	16–17	Road to Canopus. Temple of Sarapis.
17	18	Nile mounts in the Delta, Canopic (Canopus), Bolbitine (Rosetta), Sebennytic (Buto), Phantnitic (Damietta), Mendesian (Mendes), Tanitic (Tanis) and Pelusiac (Pelusium).
17	19	(sect. 19–21: Interior of the mouth of the river Nile; expulsion of foreigners; difficulty in entering Egypt.) cities Xoïs, Hermupolis, ... Mendes, ...
17	20	Athribis ... Tanis
17	21	Pelusium ... Heroönpolis
17	22	Lake Mareia, ...
17	23	... Naucratis, Saïs
17	24	discord among the Egyptians over the schoenus (i.e. a unit of distance)
17	25	city of Arsinoê; canal through the Bitter Lakes to the Gulf of Suez
17	26	Heroönpolis ... Phacussa
17	27–39	...
17	40	Cynonpolis ('City of Dogs'), ... ; overview of different animals worshipped by separate Egyptian groups or by all Egyptians in common
17	41	Hermopolitic garrison, Thebaïc garrison, ...
17	42	... Abydus
17	43	the oracle at Ammon visited by Alexander the Great
17	44	temple of Osiris in Abydus; city of Tentyra
17	45	cities Berenicê (at the Red Sea), Myus Hormus, Coptus ... ; mines of smaragdus
17	46	Thebes
17	47	city Hermonthis; a City of Crocodiles; a City of Aphroditê; Latopolis; a City of Hawks; Apollonospolis
17	48	Syenê; Elephantinê; nilometer
17	49	the First Cataract, above Elephantinê; settlement Philae, holding an Aethiopian bird in honour
17	50–54	...

==== Chapter 2 ====
Book	Section	Description
17	1–3	Ethiopia
17	4—5	...

==== Chapter 3 ====
Book	Section	Description
17	1–25	...

== Publication history ==
=== Manuscripts ===
Some thirty manuscripts of Geographica or parts of it have survived, almost all of them medieval recensions, though there is 5th century palimpsest (in 3 parts) and fragmentary papyri of the 2nd - 3rd centuries. Attempts at critical editions during the 1840s-50s Kramer, Meineke, Müller and Dübner did not benefit from these discoveries which only occurred after their publications.

The critical text of Strabo is primarily based on 5 prototype manuscripts:

Prototype Manuscripts of the Geographica
Siglum	Library	Shelfmark	Date (century)	Folios	Books	Notes	Source
A	BnF	gr. 1397	10th		1-9	Badly eaten by mice in books 8—9, leading to gaps in the text. Likely first volume of two-volume recension.	
B	Athous	Vatop. 655	14th (middle)		1-17	Books 8—9 abridged or incomplete.	
C	BnF	gr. 1393	13th (end)		1—17	Best text after A. Books 8—9 abridged or incomplete.	
D	Marcian	gr. ΧΙ 6	14th		10—16	Likely second volume of two volume recension.	
F	Vatican	gr. 1329	13th—14th		12—17		
P	Vatican	gr. 2061 A	5th	137, 235–242, 237240, 244+253, 246+252, 247+251, 248+250, 249, 309–316.		Rare 5th century bi-rescriptus (twice rewritten) palimpsest, now split into 3 manuscripts. Written in 3 columns of Greek ogival majuscule. Originally of 44 square leaves, similar to the Codex Sinaiticus and Codex Vaticanus. Possibly written in Caesarea and held in the Law school of Berytus. Erased and rewritten with the Nomocanon in the 8th century and finally again with Pentateuch and Gregory of Nazianzus’ Orations in Southern Italy the 10th century.	
P	Vatican	gr. 2306	5th	2+3, 5, 6, 7–22, 23+30, 25+28, 26+27, 31–68, C2, 69, C1, C3, C3, C1, 70, C2, 71–84.		Rare 5th century bi-rescriptus (twice rewritten) palimpsest, now split into 3 manuscripts. Written in 3 columns of Greek ogival majuscule. Originally of 44 square leaves, similar to the Codex Sinaiticus and Codex Vaticanus. Possibly written in Caesarea and held in the Law school of Berytus. Erased and rewritten with the Nomocanon in the 8th century and finally again with Pentateuch and Gregory of Nazianzus’ Orations in Southern Italy the 10th century.	
	Grottaferrata	Crypt.A.δ.XXIII	5th	2+3, 5, 6, 7–22, 23+30, 25+28, 26+27, 31–68, C2, 69, C1, C3, C3, C1, 70, C2, 71–84.		Rare 5th century bi-rescriptus (twice rewritten) palimpsest, now split into 3 manuscripts. Written in 3 columns of Greek ogival majuscule. Originally of 44 square leaves, similar to the Codex Sinaiticus and Codex Vaticanus. Possibly written in Caesarea and held in the Law school of Berytus. Erased and rewritten with the Nomocanon in the 8th century and finally again with Pentateuch and Gregory of Nazianzus’ Orations in Southern Italy the 10th century.	

Epitomies & Excerpts
Siglum	Library	Shelfmark	Date (century)	Folios	Source
E	Vatican	gr. 482	14th	145—204	
X	Heidelberge	Palatinus gr. 398	9th	60-156	

Today there are about thirty manuscripts in existence, with a fragmentary palimpsest of the fifth century the earliest (Vaticanus gr. 2306 + 2061 A). Two manuscripts in Paris provide the best extant text: Parisinus gr. 1397 of the tenth century for Books 1-9, and Parisinus gr. 1393 of the thirteenth century for the entire text. The end of Book 7 had been lost sometime in the latter Byzantine period.

=== Papryri ===
Papyri of the Geographica
Siglum	Repository	Shelfmark	Date (century)	Section	Source
Π^{1}		P.Köln 8	2nd-3rd	Book 7	
Π2	Oxford	P.Oxy. 3447	2nd	Book 9 (fragments)	
Π3		P.Laur. III 294 A	2nd-3rd		
Π4	Oxford	P.Oxy. 4459	2nd-3rd	Book 2 (5.20-24)	
	Oxford	P.Oxy. LXXXI 5268	2nd	Book 1 (2.31)	
	Oxford	P.Oxy. LXXIII 4947	2nd-3rd	Book 5 (4.12-13)	

=== Editions and translations ===
A Latin translation commissioned by Pope Nicholas V appeared around 1469, and another one in 1472. These were probably used by Columbus and other early Renaissance explorers. The first printed Greek edition was the Aldine of 1516, and the first text with commentary was produced by Isaac Casaubon in Geneva in 1587. The Teubner edition appeared in 1852-3 under the editorship of August Meineke.

The first semi-critical Greek text was established by Kramer, Meineke, Müller and Dübner during the 1840s-50s, notably before the discovery and study of the 5th century palimpsets by Cardinal Angelo Mai, Giuseppe Cozza Luzi and Pierre Batiffol in 1844, 1875 and 1888. The first fully critical edition was only completed in 2011 Stefan Radt.

==== Latin ====
- Strabonis Geographia (in Latina Gregorio Typhernate et Guarino Veronese). Rome. 1469. Editio princeps commissioned by Pope Nicholas V
- Strabo: Geographia, libri XVI. Venice. 1472.
- Isaac, Casaubon (1578). Isaac Casauboni Commentarius et Castigatones in Geographicorum Strabonis (in Latin). excudebat Eustathius Vignon Atrebat.

==== Greek text ====
- Tyrrhenus, Benedictus (1516). ΣΤΡΆΒΟΝΟΙ ΓΕΟΓΡΑΦΙΚΏΝ [Strábonoi Geographikōn] (in Ancient Greek). Venice, Aldine Press: Andreas Torresanus.
- Kramer, Gustav, ed., Strabonis Geographica, 3 vols, containing Books 1–17. Berlin: Friedericus Nicolaus, 1844–52.
- Meineke, August (1852–53). Strabonis Geographica (in Ancient Greek). Vol. 1–3. Leipzig: Teubner.
- Carl, Müller; Dübner, Friedrich (1853–58). Strabonis Geographica graece cum versione reficta (in Ancient Greek). Vol. 1–2. Paris: Didot.

==== English ====
- Hamilton, H.C.; Falconer, W. (1854–57). The geography of Strabo. Literally translated, with notes. Vol. 1–3. London: H.G. Bohn. Vol.2 The first English translation of the full work.
- Strabo (1917–1932). The Loeb Classical Library: The Geography of Strabo: in Eight Volumes (in Ancient Greek and English). Translated by Jones, Horace Leonard. Cambridge, Massachusetts/London: Harvard University Press/William Heinemann. Contains Books 1–17, Greek on the left page, English on the right. Sterrett translated Books I and II and wrote the introduction before dying in 1915. Jones changed Sterrett's style from free to more literal and finished the translation. The Introduction contains a major bibliography on all aspects of Strabo and a definitive presentation of the manuscripts and editions up until 1917. Greek text based on Meineke (1852–53).
- Roller, Duane W. (2014). The Geography of Strabo: An English Translation, with Introduction and Notes. Cambridge University Press. ISBN 978-1-139-95249-1.
- Pothecary, Sarah (2024). Strabo's Geography: A Translation for the Modern World. Princeton University Press. ISBN 978-0-691-24313-9.

==== French ====
- Tardieu, Amédée (1886). Géographie de Strabon: Traduction Nouvelle: Tome Premier (in French). Paris: Librairie Hachette. Books I – VI only.
- Tardieu, Amédée (1873). Géographie de Strabon: Traduction Nouvelle: Tome Deuxième (in French). Paris: Librairie Hachette. Books VII – XII only.

==== German ====
- Radt, Stefan (translator; critical apparatus) (2002–2011). Strabons Geographika. Göttingen: Vandenhoeck & Ruprecht. Books I–XVII in ten volumes.

== See also ==
- De situ orbis from Albi
- Ptolemy's Geography
- Description of Greece
- Bibliotheca historica
- Diodorus Siculus
- Codex Vaticanus 2061
