= Zygii =

Ancient nation in the Western Caucuses

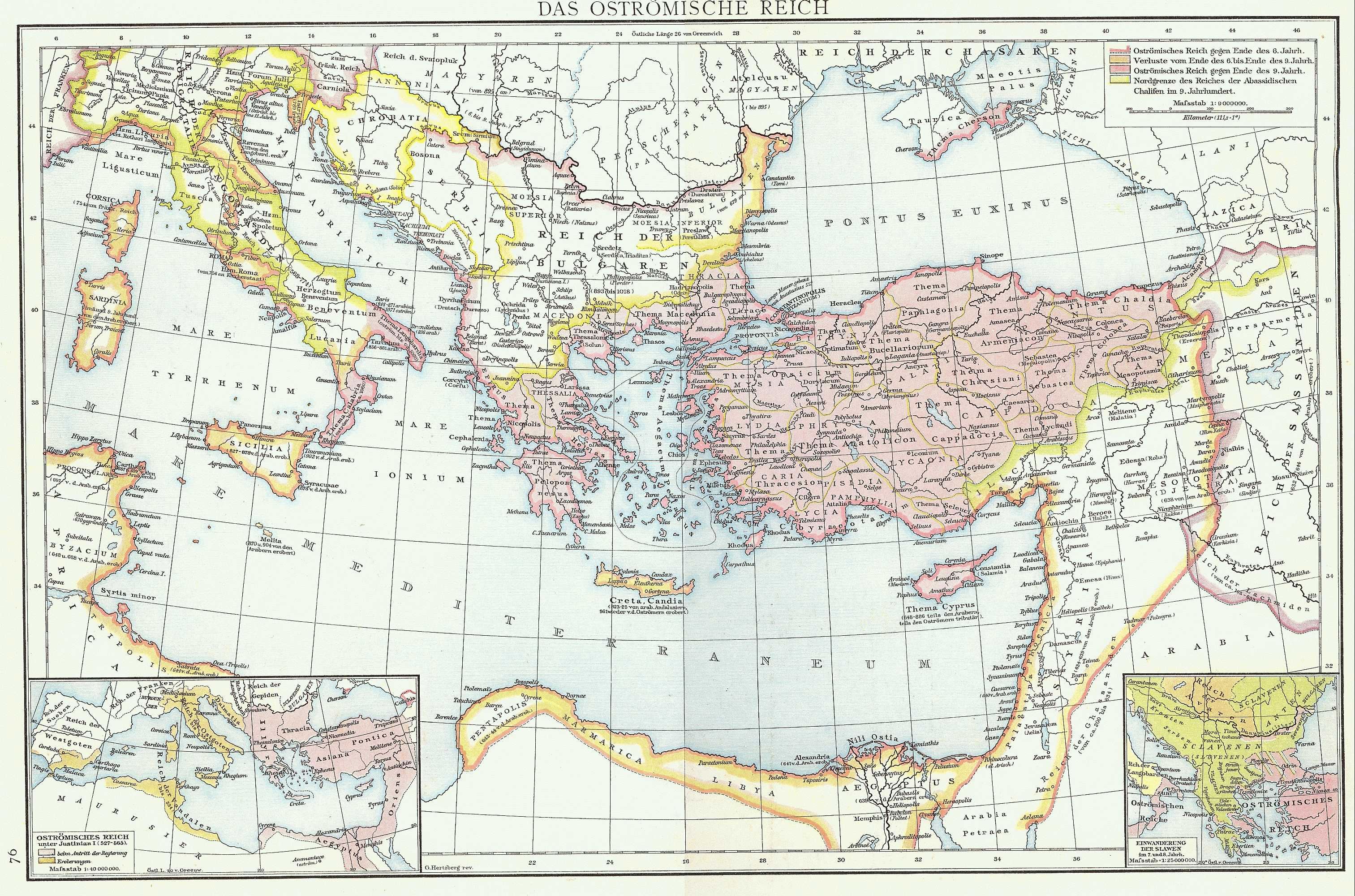
- Historical Map of the Byzantine Empire by Gustav Droysen, showing the Zygii on the northeastern coast of the Black Sea
- (Circassian) Circassian (including those of ancestral descent)

Regions with significant populations
- Northeastern Black Sea coast

Languages
- Proto-Circassian, Proto-Abazgi

Religion
- Khabzeism; Christianity

Related ethnic groups
- Agri (Maeotae); Heniochi; Arrechi; Aspurgiani; Cercetae; Dandarii; Dosci; Maeotians; Obidiaceni; Sittaceni; Tarpetes; Toreatae; Abasgoi; Apsilae; Sanigs; Misimians

The Zygii (Ancient Greek: Ζυγοί, Zygoí) or Zygians were described by Strabo as a nation to the north of Colchis. He wrote:

And on the sea lies the Asiatic side of the Bosporus, or the Syndic territory. After this latter, one comes to the Achaei and the Zygii and the Heniochi, and also the Cercetae and the Macropogones. And above these are situated the narrow passes of the Phtheirophagi (Phthirophagi); and after the Heniochi the Colchian country, which lies at the foot of the Caucasian, or Moschian, Mountains. (Strabo, Geographica 11.2)

William Smith observes that "they were partly nomad shepherds, partly brigands and pirates, for which latter vocation they had ships specially adapted". They inhabited the region known as Zyx, which is on the northern slopes of the Western Caucasus. To the east were the Avars. To the north was Sarmatian territory, and to the south lay the part of Colchis inhabited by the Svans (Soanes of Strabo and Pliny the Elder).

Initially, Zyx (Italian: Sychia, Georgian: ჯიქეთი, Jiqeti) in Greek literature referred to a people inhabiting the area between Gagra and Tuapse, who later expanded up to the estuary of the Kuban and the neighbouring region of historical Tmutarakan. This tribe also features in several ancient and medieval works, notably in Pliny (Zichoi), Constantine VII Porphyrogennetos, medieval Georgian chroniclers (Georgian: ჯიქები, Jikebi), Marco Polo, and Johannes de Galonifontibus, who, in his Libellus de notitia orbis, speaks of "Zikia or Circassia" and their language, perhaps the earliest reference to the Northwest Caucasian languages.

Researchers assume that the Zygii spoke a Northwest Caucasian language. Northwest Caucasian hydro- and toponyms, traditional names of rulers and also the seamless transition from the Zygii and the Cercetae, whose designations were subsequently replaced with the names of several Circassian tribes, confirm this.

== See also ==
- Zichia
- Kassogians
- Circassia
