= Battle of Lake Maeotis =

Battle in 309 BC

Date	309 BC
Location	Sea of Azov, Crimea
Result	Siracen Victory; Eumelos becomes King of the Cimmerians

Belligerents
Siraces	Bosporan Kingdom

Commanders and leaders
Eumelos; Aripharnes(?)	Prytanis (surrendered)

Strength
Unknown	Unknown

Casualties and losses
Low	High

The Battle of Lake Maeotis was a military engagement of the Spartocid civil war that took place in winter of 309 BC near the Maeotic Lake. It was fought between the forces of Prytanis I, who succeeded his late brother Satyros II, and the pretender Eumelos who had recently killed Satyros II at Siracena.

== Prelude and Battle ==
Satyros II had been killed at Siracena while besieging the town with Aripharnes and Eumelos inside. After his death, the mercenary commander Meniscus, took Satyros' body to Gargaza and gave it to Prytanis, the younger brother of Satyros and Eumelos. He buried his brother after taking the throne. Then Prytanis left a garrison in Gargaza and returned to Panticapaeum to secure his position while Eumelos and Aripharnes quickly took Gargaza. Shortly after, Prytanis took the field against his brother but was quickly cornered and defeated.
