= Paerisades II =

King of the Bosporan Kingdom from 284 to 245 BC

King of the Bosporan Kingdom
- Reign: 284–ca. 245 BC
- Predecessor: Spartokos III
- Successor: Spartokos IV
- Born: Unknown; Bosporan Kingdom
- Died: circa. 245 BC; Bosporan Kingdom
- Issue: Spartokos IV; Leukon II
- Greek: Παιρισάδης
- House: Spartocid
- Father: Satyros II or Spartokos III
- Religion: Greek Polytheism

Paerisades II (Greek: Παιρισάδης; died c. 245 BC) or Parysades was king of the Bosporan Kingdom from 284 to 245 BC. He may have been a son of either Spartokos III, or Satyros II.

== Reign ==
Paerisades II was either the son or cousin of Spartokos III, a previous ruler but may have the son of Satyros II. In the aftermath of the Bosporan Civil War, Eumelos, Spartokos III's father and a Bosporan king, executed the families and friends of his brothers Satyros and Prytanis. Satyros's youngest son, named Paerisades, survived and fled into Scythia where he took refuge with its king, Agarus.

Paerisades was unexpectedly active in diplomacy throughout the Hellenistic kingdoms of the Diadochi. He is mentioned in a letter from Apollonius to Zenon as having sent ambassadors to the court of Ptolemy II, the pharaoh of Ptolemaic Egypt, who took the opportunity to sight-see. Also, he was a donor and made cup offerings at Delos together with the Macedonian king Antigonus II, and a woman named Stratonice, not to be confused with Stratonice of Macedon, Antigonus's grandmother, who died no later than 301 BC.

== Succession ==
After having ruled for around 39 years, Paerisades died in 245 BC. He was succeeded by his presumably eldest son Spartokos IV, who ruled for only a brief period of about 5 years. Spartokos IV was then succeeded by Leukon II, Paerisades's younger son, who killed his elder brother in a dispute over adultery with Leukon's own wife.

== See also ==
- Ptolemaic Egypt
- Kingdom of Macedon
- Bosporan Civil War
