= Siege of Siracena =

Battle in 309 BC

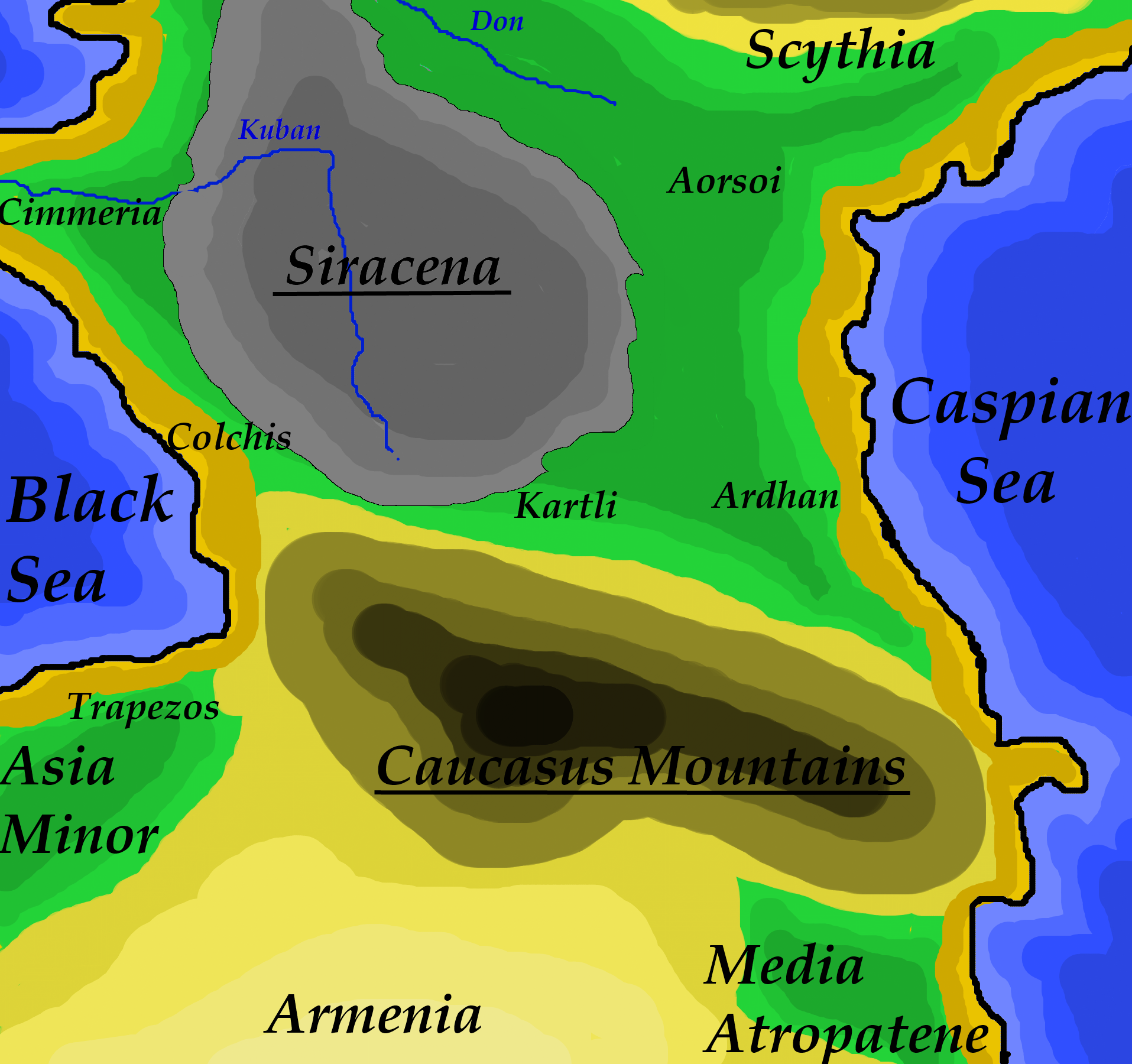
- Part of the Bosporan Civil War
| Date | 309 BC |
| Location | Siracena, Sarmatia |
| Result | Siraceni victory |

Belligerents
| The Siraceni | Bosporans, Scythians |

Commanders and leaders
| Eumelos, Aripharnes | Satyrus II †; Meniscus |

Strength
| Siracen Infantry | Thracian peltasts Greek hoplites Scythian Infantry |

Casualties and losses
| Low | High |

The siege of Siracena was a Bosporan siege led by Satyrus II and Meniscus on the fortified capital city of the Siraces, Siracena, that occurred in 309 BC during the first Bosporan civil war. The Siraces were a hellenized Sarmatian tribe that had sided with Eumelos, a claimant to the Bosporan throne and a brother of Satyrus.

== Prelude ==
Before the siege, the Bosporan army which had been composed of 34,000 troops (20,000 Scythian Infantry, 10,000 Scythian cavalry, 2,000 Thracians peltasts and 2,000 Greek mercenaries hoplites) had successfully defeated and routed Aripharnes and Eumelos, and the Siracen army of 42,000 (22,000 Infantry, 20,000 cavalry) during the Battle of the River Thatis.

Satyrus gave immediate chase to his younger brother, where he came up the Siracen capital city of Siracena which was heavily fortified and situated on that the river Thatis. Knowing that he could not take the city, he plundered the surrounding countryside and took on many prisoners.

== Siege ==
Satyrus had his men cut through the trees that surrounded the easiest entry way of the city for a total of 4 days, although on the third day, they began to experience missile fire and arrows from the Siracens on the city's walls, they could not fight back as the woods were too thick and could not see who was firing at them, or from where. On the fourth day, they were able to reach the wall and enter the city. As soon as he made it through, Meniscus fought with great valor and boldness against his enemies, but had to retreat once a larger force of Siracens had arrived at his location. Seeing his friend in danger, Satyrus rushed to his aid and fought valiantly, but was struck with a spear to his right shoulder and he was carried to camp. Satyrus died that night, and Meniscus gave up the siege and took his body back to Panticapaeum.

== Aftermath ==
Meniscus returned the body of his friend Satyrus to his younger brother Prytanis, who then assumed the title of basileus and continued his brother's war against his other brother Eumelos. Prytanis would later be spared, to only be later killed after his attempt to usurp his brother Eumelos and he would become ruler of the Bosporan Kingdom and expand its fame and naval power in the Black Sea.
