= Rimphaces =

Nomadic tribe

The Rimphaces were a tribe of Iranian Nomads who likely spoke a Sarmatian language of the Scythian family. They are mentioned by Pliny the Elder as living north of the Amazons and Hyperboreans, with the Cimmeri, Acae, Georgili, Moschi, Cercetae, Cissianti, and Phoristae.
