= Cissianti =

Iranian Nomadic Tribe

The Cissianti were a tribe of Iranian Nomads who likely spoke a Sarmatian language of the Scythian family. They are mentioned by Pliny the Elder as living north of the Amazons and Hyperboreans, with the Cimmeri, Acae, Georgili, Moschi, Cercetae, Phoristae, and Rimphaces.
