= Olthacus =

Olthacus (Ancient Greek: Ὀλθακός) was a chief of the Scythian tribe of the Dandarians.

He served in the army of Mithridates VI. He later deserted to the Romans, which was according to the account of Plutarch, a feint, with the purpose of gaining access to Lucullus, so as to assassinate him, but was instead foiled in this endeavour. Appian provides the same details in an account but instead terms him Olcabas.
