= Spartocus III =

King of the Bosporan Kingdom from 304 to 284 BC

Basileus of the Bosporan Kingdom
- Reign: 304–284 BC
- Predecessor: Eumelus
- Successor: Paerisades II
- Born: Unknown; Bosporan Kingdom
- Died: circa. 284 BC; Bosporan Kingdom
- Issue: Paerisades II (?)
- Greek: Σπάρτοκος
- House: Spartocid
- Father: Eumelus
- Religion: Greek Polytheism

Spartocus III (Greek: Σπάρτοκος, romanized: Spartokos; died c. 284 BC) was king of the Bosporan Kingdom from 304 to 284 BC. He succeeded to the throne after the death of his father Eumelus in a carriage accident.

== Reign ==
Spartocus inherited the throne from his father in 304 BC, after his father's unexpected death during his return from Sindia. Upon assuming the throne, he became the first Bosporan ruler to take the title of Basileus, likely following the example of contemporary Hellenistic kings such as the Antigonids, Lysimachids, Seleucids and Ptolemies. As soon as the Athenian trade was liberated from Demetrius, Spartocus sought to renew his relationship with Athens, which had already been trade partners with the Bosporan Kingdom in the reign of his great-grandfather Leukon. Spartocus received Athenian honors, thanking him and his predecessors for maintaining good relations with Athens.

== Succession ==
Spartocus died in 284 after ruling for twenty years. He was succeeded by Paerisades II, who may have been the son of Satyrus II who escaped and survived Eumelus' slaughter of the family, but may also have been Spartocus' own son.

== See also ==
- Kingdom of Macedon
- Ptolemaic Egypt
- Seleucid Empire
- Lysimachus
