= Aspurgiani =

The Aspurgiani (Greek: Ἀσπουργιανοί or Ἀσπουγγιτανοί) were an ancient people, a tribe of the Maeotae dwelling along east side of the Strait of Kerch along the Palus Maeotis in antiquity. They seem to be identical with the "Asturicani" of Ptolemy (v. 9. § 7).

The Aspurgiani inhabited the region called Sindica, between Phanagoria and Gorgippia, among the Maeotae, Sindi, Dandarii, Toreatae, Agri, Arrechi, Tarpetes, Obidiaceni, Sittaceni and Dosci, among others. (Strab. xi. 2. 11). They were among the Maeotic tribes whom King Polemon I of Pontus and the Bosporus, in the reign of Roman Emperor Augustus, attempted to subdue; however, they took him prisoner and put him to death. (Strab. xi. p. 495, xii. p. 556; Steph. B. s. v.; see Ritter's speculations on the name, in connection with the origin of the name of Asia, Vorhalle, pp. 296, foil.).

Scholars often attribute artifacts found in the Bosporus and Gorgippia, which featured the Sun god or its symbols, to the Aspurgiani tribes, indicating their Iranian descent. These tribes were first mentioned in Strabo's works as the group who killed Polemo when he launched a treacherous attack. An account cited that these tribes were more of a political party or a military colony rather than a tribe, having been founded by a person called Aspurgus, who once was a king of the Bosporan kingdom. The Babylonian Talmud Bava kama 65b mentions one "Guryon from Asporak" c.3nd century ce and some scholars identify Asporak as Aspurgiani.
