= Zichia =

Medieval Circassian kingdom

Kingdom of Zichia Адзыгъуей (Adyghe) Aдыгей (Adyghe)
- c. 100–c. 13th century
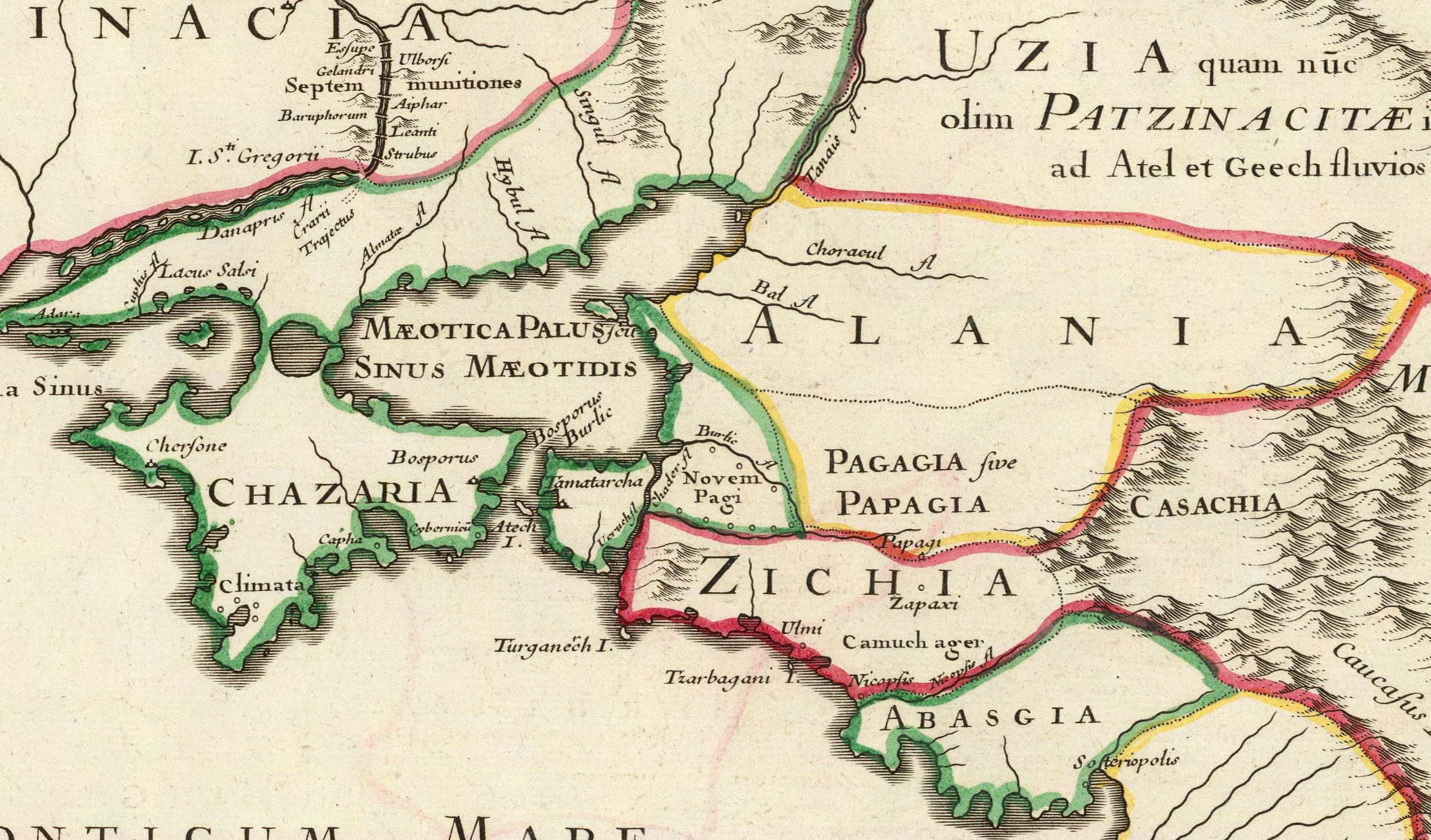
- Map showing Zichia.
- Common languages: Circassian
- Religion: Khabzeism; Christianity
- Government: Kingdom; Princedom
- History
  - Established: c. 100
  - Disestablished: c. 13th century
Preceded by	Succeeded by
Zygii; Maeotians	Circassia

Zichia (Note: This word is of Greek origin. The original Greek word is Ζιχία /zi.ˈçi.a/. In English, it can also be spelt as Zekchia.) (/ˈzɪkiə/; Medieval Circassian: Адзыгъуей, Adyghe: Адыгей) was the term used in ancient and medieval maps to refer to Circassia, as well as a medieval kingdom on the northeastern shore of the Black Sea, inhabited by Circassians.

== History ==
The exact borders of the kingdom are unknown. According to the 10th-century Byzantine emperor Constantine VII Porphyrogennetos (r. 913–959), it lay south of Tamatarcha (Tmutorokan), separated from it by the river Oukrouch (possibly to be identified with the Kuban River), and had a city called Nikopsis. According to a legend about a visit of the Apostle Andrew there, it lay between Abasgia (Abkhazia) and the Cimmerian Bosporus (Strait of Kerch).

In historical sources, the area first appears in the 6th century, when the Byzantine historian Procopius of Caesarea (Wars, VIII.4.2) records that the people of the Zechoi used to have a king appointed by the Roman Emperor, but that they had since become independent. The Notitiae Episcopatuum of the Patriarchate of Constantinople mention an autocephalous archbishopric of Zichia from the 7th century on, associated with Tamatarcha or the Cimmerian Bosporus.

At the time of Constantine VII, Byzantine dealings with the area were carried out by the inhabitants of Cherson. In the 11th century, the Byzantines may have established control over the region, as attested by the seal of a Michael, "archon of Zichia, Khazaria, and Gothia", but this is disputed among modern scholars. In the 12th century, Emperor Manuel I Komnenos (r. 1143–1180) used the title "emperor of Zichia, Khazaria, and Gothia", but it is unclear to which extent this claim corresponded to reality.

In the 13th century, the area was visited by Hungarian and Italian travellers, who called it Sychia (and other variants thereof). These travellers located Matrica (Tmutorokan) within Sychia.

The symbol of Zichia was a veveritsa (a small fur-bearing animal, squirrel or weasel) according to a Bulgarian apocryphal text known as Razomnik-Ukaz, written between 1235 and 1274.

== Known rulers ==
- Arrian (89–146) mentions a king of Zichia named Stachemfak
- In the 500s, King Bakhsan the son of King Daw fought with the Goths.
- King Lawristan is mentioned as the king in the 700s–800.
- Rashid-ad-Din in the Persian Chronicles wrote that the Zichian king Tukar was killed in battle against the Mongols in 1237.
- In 1333, Pope John XXII thanked the King Verzacht (Верзахта in Cyrillic script) of Zichia (Circassia) for his assistance in implementing the Christian faith among Circassians.
- In 1471, the ruler of Caffa, Uffizio di San Giorgio, signed a contract with the ruler of Circassia, "the paramount lord of Zichia" for supplying of Caffa with large quantities of grain by Zichia.
- Kansavuk is mentioned by Malbakhov as a king of Zichia in 1542.

== See also ==
- Zygii
