= Battle of the River Thatis =

Battle in 310 or 309 BC

- Part of the Bosporan Civil War
Date	310/309 BC
Location	Thatis River
Result	Victory of Satyros II

Belligerents
Bosporan Kingdom Scythians	Siraces

Commanders and leaders
Satyros II; Meniscus	Eumelus; Aripharnes

Strength
2,000 Greek mercenaries 2,000 Thracians; 20,000 Scythian infantry 10,000 Scythian cavalry	20,000 cavalry 22,000 infantry

The Battle of the River Thatis was part of a succession dispute in the Bosporan Kingdom that was fought out during 310/309 BC. After the death of Paerisades I, his eldest son Satyros II became king. His brother Eumelus disputed Satyros II's right to the throne and gathered an army with his allies, the Siraces tribe. With his Scythian allies Satyrus met Eumelus in battle at the River Thatis, where Eumelus and the Siraces were defeated. Satyrus led his cavalry in a charge towards the centre of the line where Aripharnes, the king of the Siraces, was with his own cavalry and put them to flight. When he heard his mercenaries had fled from the fight with the right wing which was led by Eumelus, he attacked the enemy's right wing and broke their army.

The defeat was not decisive: Eumelus and his allies escaped to the capital city of the Siraces, which was situated along the River Thatis. During the siege of that city Satyrus incurred many casualties and was mortally wounded himself. After Satyrus's death, Eumelus defeated another brother, Prytanis, and seized the throne of the Bosporan Kingdom.

== Prelude ==
In 310/309 BC King Paerisades died. His eldest son Satyrus succeeded him as king, but his younger brothers Eumelus and Prytanis contended with him for the throne. Eumelus made an alliance with the Siraces, raised a strong army and made his own claim to the throne. Satyrus gathered his own army and marched against him near the Thatis river. The location of this river (also called Thates) is unknown, but it is thought that the battle took place somewhere between the lower Kuban River and the Caucasus mountains.

== Battle ==
When Satyrus moved his army into battle formations, he placed himself with the phalanx at the centre. This was a Scythian custom according to Diodorus Siculus, the historian who is the sole source of information on the battle. He had 2,000 Greek mercenaries and 2,000 Thracians at his disposal, but the bulk of his army consisted of his Scythian allies. These numbered more than 20,000 infantry and 10,000 cavalry. Eumelus had Aripharnes, the king of the Siraces, as his ally. He commanded 20,000 cavalry and 22,000 infantry.

When the battle had begun, Satyrus gathered his best cavalry around him and charged at Aripharnes, who was in the centre of the enemy line. Both sides sustained many losses, but Satyrus finally managed to rout Aripharnes. He pursued to kill the fleeing troops, but stopped when he heard that his brother Eumelus was winning on his right wing and that his own mercenaries had fled. He aided his own troops who were under pressure and succeeded in routing the entire army of Eumelus.

== Aftermath ==
Aripharnes and Eumelus managed to escape to the capital city of the Siraces, Siracena, which was located on the Thatis River. Siracena was difficult to besiege because the deep river surrounded it. Surrounded by tall cliffs and dense woods, it had two entrances. One was through the fortified royal castle, which was defended by fortified towers and outworks, and one through a swamp, fortified by a wooden palisade. Satyrus at first started plundering the territories around the city, but eventually decided to start the difficult siege of the capital. He suffered many casualties in an unsuccessful attempt to take the entrance through the castle, but he managed to defeat the defenders at the entry through the swamp.

After crossing the river, Satyrus began to cut down the woods to clear the route for an attack on the city's walls. Aripharnes sent archers to both sides of the passage to shoot the men who cut down the trees, causing some casualties. A passage to the wall was cleared after three days work. On the fourth day the army of Satyrus assaulted the walls, but the resistance by the defenders was heavy. The attackers suffered heavy losses due to arrow fire from the walls and the confined space. When Meniscus, the leader of his mercenaries, was endangered in the fight, Satyrus moved in personally to support him. During the fight Satyrus was seriously wounded when he was stabbed in the upper arm with a spear. He retreated to his camp, where he died that night, after being king for nine months.

Meniscus gave up the siege and transferred the body of the king back to Panticapaeum. There Satyrus was given a royal burial by his brother Prytanis. Prytanis continued the war with Eumelus, but was defeated and killed by the latter. Eumelus then took the crown as the new king of the Bosporan Kingdom.

== Sources ==
- Diodorus Siculus (1954). Geer, Russell M. (ed.). Library of History. Vol. 10. Cambridge, Massachusetts: Harvard University Press. ISBN 978-0-674-99429-4.
- Minns, Ellis Hovell (2011). Scythians and Greeks: A Survey of Ancient History and Archaeology on the North Coast of the Euxine from the Danube to the Caucasus. Cambridge, United Kingdom: Cambridge University Press. ISBN 978-1-108-02487-7.
