= Cercetae =

The Cercetae are an ancient people of Scythia mentioned by Strabo and Pliny the Elder. They are one of many ancient tribes of the Northwestern Caucasus which are the ancestors of modern Circassians. The name "Cercetae" apparently was the basis of the name of the people that arose later - the Circassians. The ethnonym itself of presumably Iranian origin or derived from the κερκέτηζ, is a kind of "stern oar”, and is the nickname given to them by the Greeks due to their skill in the sea business.

Pliny places them beyond the Amazons and the Hyperboreans, together with the Cimmerii, Cissianti, Achaei, Georgili, Moschi, Phoristae and Rimphaces.

== See also ==
- Zygii
- Circassians
- Maeotians
