= Prytanis of Bosporus =

Prytanis

King of the Bosporan Kingdom
- Reign: 310–309 BC
- Predecessor: Satyros II
- Successor: Eumelos
- Born: Unknown; Bosporan Kingdom
- Died: 309 BC "The Gardens"
- Greek: Πρύτανης
- House: Spartocid
- Father: Paerisades I
- Mother: Komosarye
- Religion: Greek polytheism

Prytanis (Greek: Πρύτανης; died 309 BC) was king of the Bosporan Kingdom from 310 to 309 BC. He was a son of Paerisades and the youngest brother of Satyros II and Eumelos. He was part of the Bosporan Civil War during 309 BC, between himself and his brothers, Eumelos having a claim to the throne and the backing of Aripharnes, king of the Siraces.

== Reign and defeat ==
Not much is known about Prytanis prior to the civil war, but he was the youngest son of Paerisades, and thus last in line of succession, and sided with his eldest brother Satyros when Eumelos launched his rival claim for the throne. Upon Satyros' death, his mercenary captain Meniscus brought the body back to Panticapaeum through Gargaza. Here, Prytanis held a great funeral for his elder brother and quickly went to Gargaza, taking both the army and royal power. Eumelos sent envoys to Prytanis, but he ignored them and left a garrison in Gargaza so that he could quickly return to Panticapaeum in order to secure the throne for himself.

While Prytanis was in Panticapaeum, Eumelos took Gargaza and several other cities. Prytanis then took the field against his brother near the Maeotic Lake, but was defeated and Eumelos forced him to turn over command of the army and abdicate in his favor.

== Death ==
Having already given Eumelos the throne, Prytanis once again entered Panticapaeum. As he walked through it, he knew that it had been the capital of his ancestors and presumably wanted his throne back. After attempting to take the throne, he was overpowered and fled to "The Gardens" where he was cornered and killed. Eumelos, to secure his throne, killed the families and friends of Satyros and Prytanis, with Satyros's young son Paerisades only barely managing to get away to Scythia and getting refuge with Agarus.
