= Asturicani =

The Asturicani are a tribe mentioned by Ptolemy (v. 9. § 7) as dwelling adjacent to the Pontus Euxinus (Black Sea). A source cited this tribe as one of those located in Anatolia along with Ancyra, Balbura, and Carura, among others. The settlement's believed proximity to the Sea of Azov also William Smith equates them with the Aspurgiani. There are scholars who explain that this association could be based on the way the settlement may not be a tribe but a political party or a military colony. Aspurgiani is also believed to be the same.
