= Toreccadae =

The Torekkadae or Toreccadae (Greek: Τορεκκάδαι) are an ancient tribe mentioned by Ptolemy (iii. 5. § 25) as dwelling in European Sarmatia. William Smith tentatively identifies them with the Toreatae.
