= Spartocus IV =

King of the Bosporan Kingdom
- Reign: c. 245–240 BC
- Predecessor: Paerisades II
- Successor: Leucon II
- Born: Unknown; Bosporan Kingdom
- Died: circa. 240 BC; Bosporan Kingdom
- Issue: Spartocus V; Paerisades (?)
- Greek: Σπάρτοκος
- House: Spartocid
- Father: Paerisades II
- Religion: Greek Polytheism

Spartocus IV (Ancient Greek: Σπάρτοκος, romanized: Spartokos; died c. 240 BC) was a Spartocid king of the Bosporan Kingdom from 245 to 240 BC.

== Biography ==
Spartocus IV was a son of Paerisades II and is known for an inscription in coinage after the death of his father that shows him calling himself king whilst displaying Pan. His brief reign ended when his brother Leucon II killed him, after finding out that he was sleeping with his wife Alcathoe, who later killed Leucon.
