= Arrechi =

The Arrechi (Greek: Ἀρρηχοί) were an ancient tribe of the Maeotae, on the east coast of the Palus Maeotis. (Strabo xi. 2. 11; Steph. B. s. v.; Plin. vi. 7.) Strabo places them among the Maeotae, Sindi, Dandarii, Toreatae, Agri, Tarpetes, Obidiaceni, Sittaceni, Dosci, and Aspurgiani, among others. (Strab. l.c.)

They are probably the same as the Arichi (Greek: Ἀριχοί) of Ptolemy (v. 9. § 18).

The Arrechi is one of the Maeotae tribes, who lived in the 1st millennium BC on the east and the south-eastern coast of the Azov sea. Russian scientists, archeologists, historians and ethnographers in the Soviet period it was concluded - Maeotae this is one of the names of the tribes Adyghe people (Circassians).

In the Great Soviet Encyclopedia, in the article about the Adyghe people, it is written,"Living in the basin of the river Kuban part of the tribes (Adyghe people), as a rule, be indicated (names) of ancient historians under the collective name 'Maeotae'." In the article about the Maeotae), it says,"Maeotae were engaged in farming and fishing. Part of the Maeotae by the language was akin to the Adygs (Circassians), the part of the Iranians. In the 4th-3rd centuries BC many of Maeotae included in the composition of the Bosporan kingdom."
