= Dosci =

The Dosci (Doschi) - were an ancient people dwelling along the Palus Maeotis in antiquity.

Strabo describes them as living among the Maeotae, Sindi, Dandarii, Toreatae, Agri, Arrechi, Tarpetes, Obidiaceni, Sittaceni, and Aspurgiani, among others.

Dosci (Doschi) is one of the Maeotae tribes, who lived in the 1st millennium BC on the east and south-east coast of the Azov sea. Russian scientists, archeologists, historians and ethnographers in the Soviet period concluded that Maeotae is one of the names of the tribes of the Adyghe people (Circassians).

In the Great Soviet Encyclopedia, in the article about the Adyghe people, it says:

Living in the basin of the river Kuban part of the tribes (Adyg people), as a rule, be indicated (names) of ancient historians under the collective name "Maeotae".

Maeotae were engaged in farming and fishing. Part of the Maeotae by the language was akin to the Adygs (Circassians), the part of the Iranians. In the 4th–3rd centuries BC, many of Maeotae were included in the Bosporan Kingdom.
