= Tarpetes =

The Tarpetes were an ancient people who once lived along the Maeotian marshes Palus Maeotis, in present-day Russia. The Tarpetes were one of many groups in that area that vanished, leaving little or no trace. Strabo describes them living among the Maeotae, Sindi, Dandarii, Toreatae, Agri, Arrechi, Obidiaceni, Sittaceni, Dosci, and Aspurgiani, among others. To date, the archaeological trail is very scanty.
