= Siracena =

Siracena (Ancient Greek: Σιρακηνή) is the alleged capital settlement or village of the tribe of Siraces, a powerful, hellenized Sarmatian tribe on the steppe. It was ruled by the kings of the Siraces, most notably Aripharnes, who engaged in the Bosporan Civil War of 309 BC.

The exact location of this settlement is unknown, but it is described as being on the Thatis River (a tributary to the Kuban).

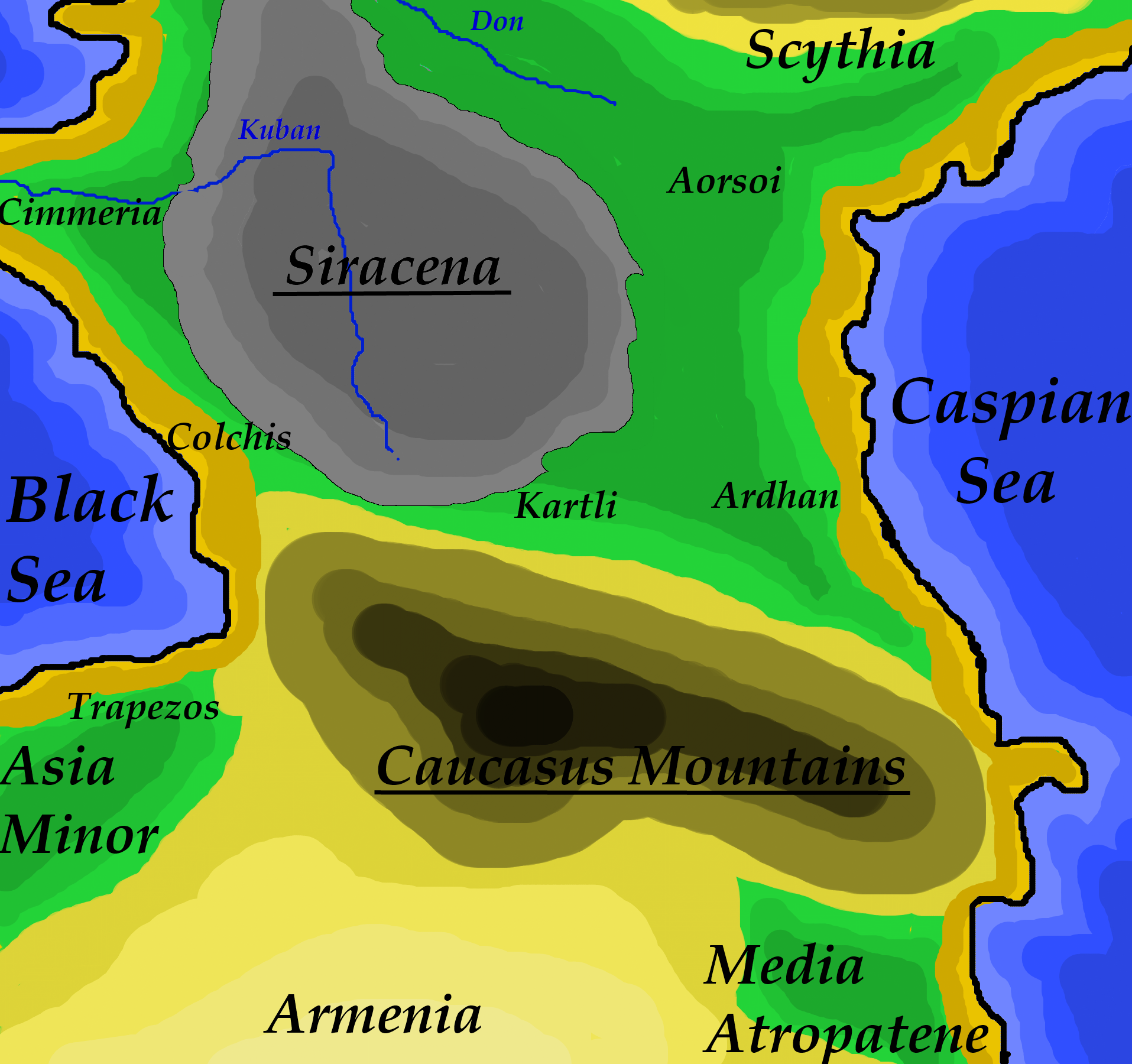
Map depicting the Caucasus region around 400 B.C. Siracena, land of the Siraces, is shown in grey, according to its approximate greatest extent.

== Fourth century BC ==
The city was besieged by Bosporan and Scythian forces during the Bosporan succession war because Aripharnes had sided with Eumelos, the pretender to the Bosporan throne. It was besieged particularly by Satyrus II, then the ruler of the Bosporan Kingdom, and his mercenary captain Meniscus who fought with great valor during the Siege of Siracena. The settlement withstood the siege all of its duration.

== Layout ==
The city was situated on the Thatis river and was encircled by it. It was surrounded by cliffs and thick forest and was only accessible through two artificial entry ways.

One side had the royal castle and was heavily defended with high wooden towers. Whilst the other side was in swamp land and had been fortified with wooden palisades.
