= Satyrus II =

King of the Bosporan Kingdom
- Reign: 310 BC
- Predecessor: Paerisades I
- Successor: Prytanis
- Born: Unknown; Bosporan Kingdom
- Died: 309 BC; Siracena, Sarmatia
- Issue: Paerisades
- Greek: Σάτυρος
- House: Spartocid
- Father: Paerisades I
- Mother: Comosarye
- Religion: Greek Polytheism

Satyrus II (Ancient Greek: Σάτυρος, romanized: Satyros; died 309 BC) was a son of Paerisades I and Spartocid king of the Bosporan Kingdom for 9 months in 310 BC. He was the elder brother of Eumelus and Prytanis. He was challenged and ultimately overthrown by Eumelus in the Bosporan Civil War.

== Reign and civil war ==
When his father Paerisades died in 310 BC, Satyrus inherited the throne and government as he was the eldest son. Shortly after, his brother Eumelus fled to the lands of the Siraces, where he entered into an alliance with Aripharnes, king of the Siraces, and made a rival claim to the throne. As soon as Satyrus learned of this, he set out against his brother Eumelus with his army thus starting the Spartocid civil war. Satyrus' army had a total of 34,000 troops, a mixture of Greeks, Thracians, and Scythians. After cornering his younger brother, they fought the Battle of the River Thatis, which resulted in a strategic victory for Satyrus and demonstrated his suitability for the throne of his father.

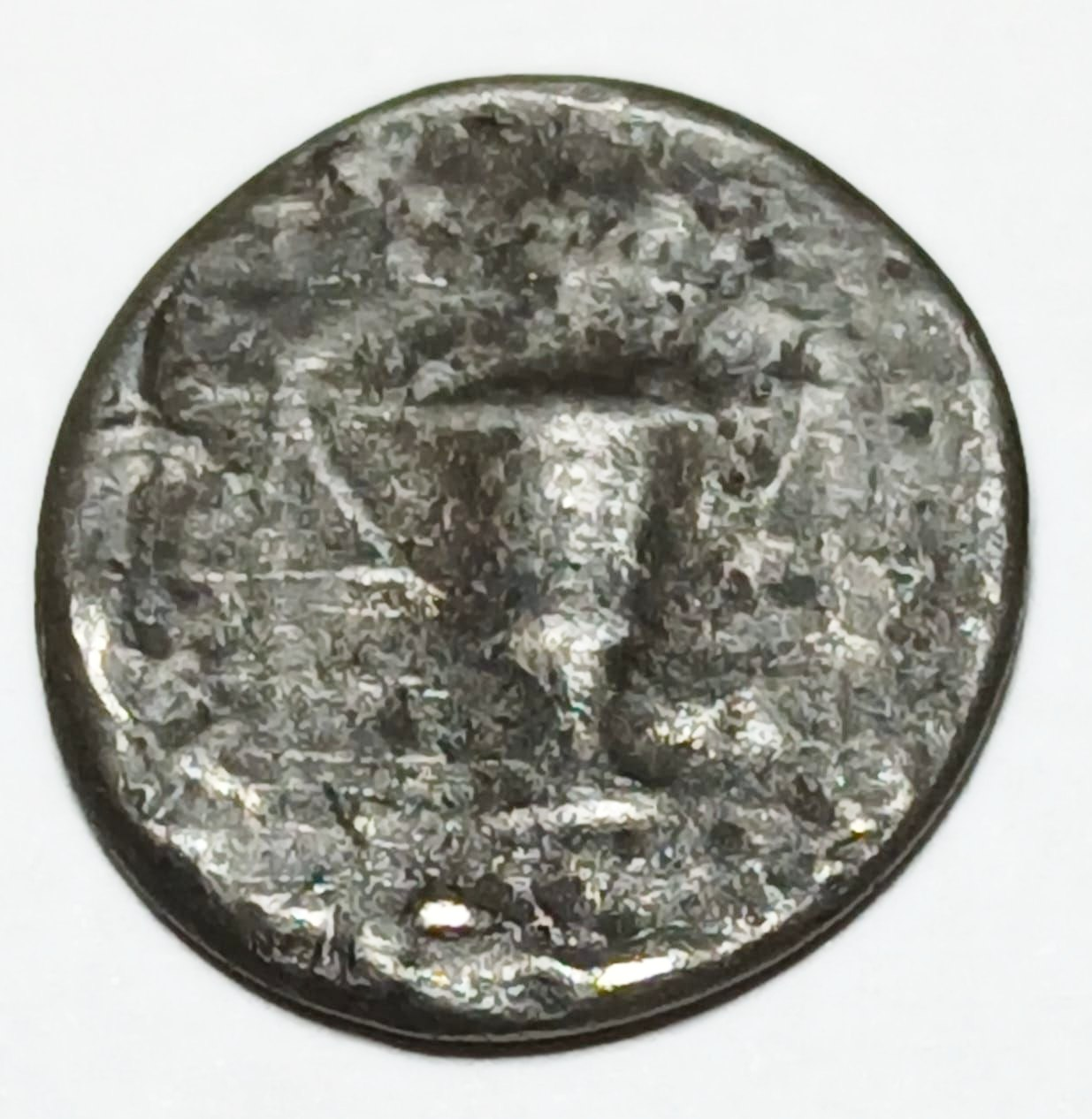
Bismuth Coin of Panticapaeum. Front side

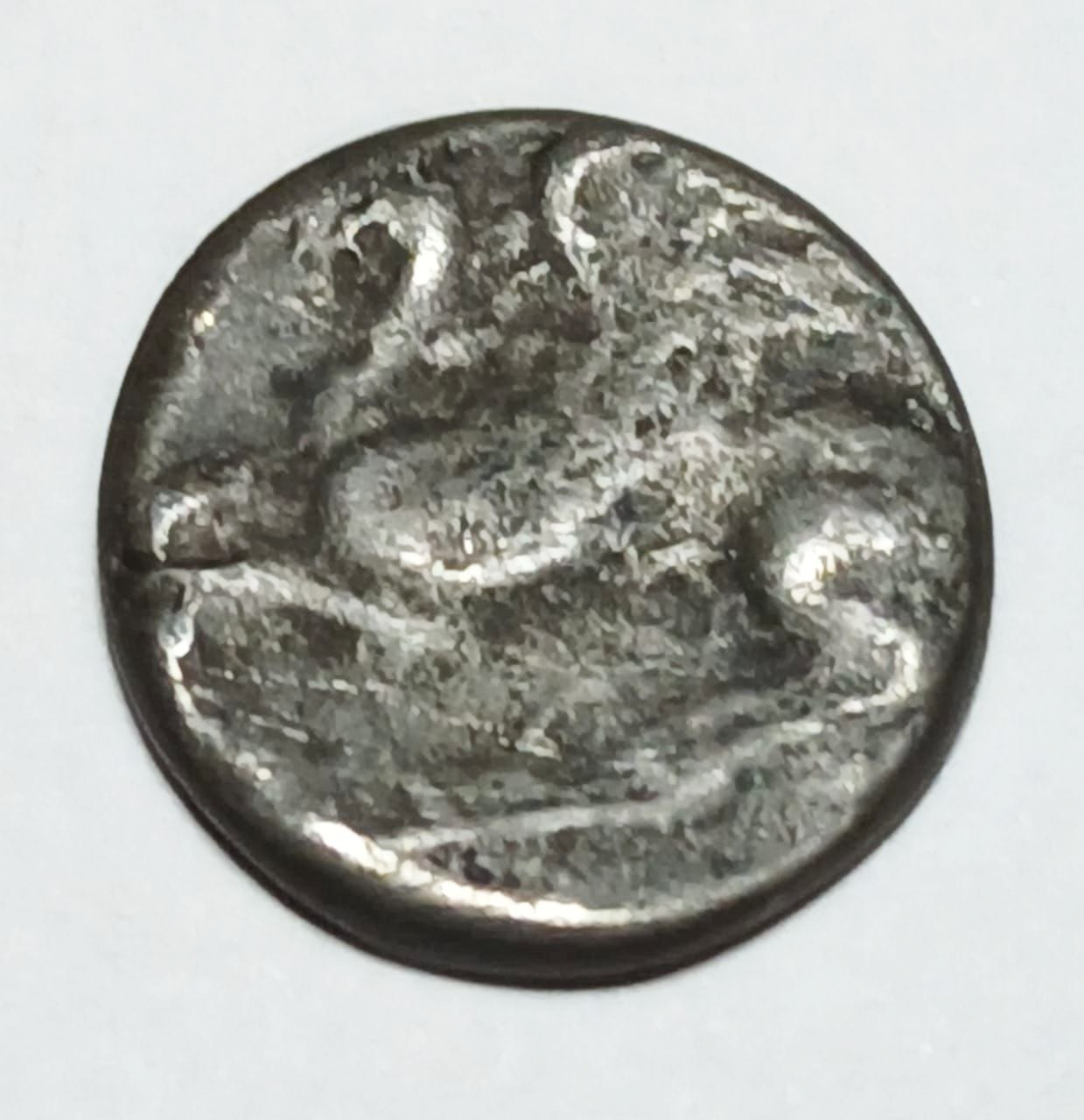
Bismuth Coin of Panticapaeum. Back side

During his reign, the minting of Panticapaeum coins continued. In particular, the Bismuth Coin of Panticapaeum was minted - this is the only known ancient coin whose main metal is bismuth.

== Final battle and death ==
Satyrus pursued his brother and his ally, Ariphanes, who both retreated to the capital of the Siraces. Upon approaching the city, he realised that it would be hard to take as the city was built on the river Thatis and surrounded by thick marshes. There were also man-made defences including a fortified gate and a well-protected castle at the other entrance. Knowing he would not be able to take the city, he plundered the countryside, gaining many prisoners and plunder.

The Siege of Siracena ensued. However Satyrus died fighting Aripharnes while attempting to protect his mercenary captain, Meniscus. His brother Prytanis became king shortly after his death, and fought Eumelus but shared the same fate.

His brother Eumelus killed the families of his brothers, but Satyrus' son, Paerisades, survived and fled to Scythia, where he was given asylum by its king, Agarus.
