= Eumelus of Bosporus =

Ruler of the Bosporan Kingdom 309–304 BC

Eumelus

King of the Bosporan Kingdom
- Reign: 309–304 BC
- Predecessor: Prytanis
- Successor: Spartocus III
- Born: Unknown, sometime before 320 BC; Panticapaeum
- Died: 304 BC; Bosporan Kingdom
- Issue: Spartocus III
- Greek: Εύμηλος
- House: Spartocid
- Father: Paerisades I
- Mother: Comosarye
- Religion: Greek polytheism

Eumelus of Bosporus (Ancient Greek: Εύμηλος, romanized: Eumelos; fl. 309 BC – 304 BC) was a Spartocid ruler of the Bosporan Kingdom and a son of Paerisades. Eumelus was the brother of Satyrus II (not to be confused with his great-grandfather, Satyrus I, another Bosporan ruler) and Prytanis.

He and his brothers engaged in a conflict for the throne, which the eldest brother, Satyrus, had inherited from their father.

== Civil war ==
Shortly after his brother Satyrus became ruler, Eumelus became a pretender to the throne with the backing of Aripharnes, a ruler of the Sarmatian tribe of Siraces from whom he solicited aid. When Satyrus learned of this, he immediately went after Eumelos with his army and crossed the River Thatis to wage war on his brother. Eumelus was defeated by him at the Battle of the River Thatis. He and Aripharnes were forced to retreat to Siracena. Satyrus and his army followed his brother to the city, but could not take it as it was surrounded by the River Thatis, leaving two heavily guarded entrances as the only means of ingress. After a four-day siege, Satyrus died while fighting against Aripharnes at the main entryway. Meniscus, Satyrus' mercenary captain, took Satyrus' body back to Panticapaeum for a royal burial and ended the siege. Prytanis, the younger brother, assumed the title of ruler and continued Satyros' war against Eumelus. Eumelus appealed to his brother to split the kingdom between them, but Prytanis rejected the proposal, marching against his brother. The two fought a battle which Eumelus won near the Maeotic Lake. Prytanis was spared by his brother but soon he waged war against Eumelus again and was killed.

== Reuniting the kingdom and expansion ==
To fully establish himself, Eumelus had the families and friends of his brothers killed. The citizens of Panticapaeum were displeased at the killing of their friends, so Eumelos gathered them to an open assembly in which he defended himself and also offered immunity from taxes for those that lived in the city.

He enacted several reforms, as well as the recruitment of more Greeks into the Bosporan military, who had previously only provided a small number of its forces, the rest being Sarmatians. He also reinforced the Bosporan fleet, to deal with the pirates and strengthen their trade routes.

Eumelus then proceeded to show kindness to other Greek cities that were in the Black Sea and gave refuge to 1,000 refugees from the city of Callantia who were driven out by Lysimachus. Eumelos led a series of campaigns against pirates in the eastern regions of the Black Sea—most likely the Tauri, the Heniochi and several others—and was able to destroy them. He also took back the settlement of Tanais, which was abandoned due to continuous sieges from local tribes and made his kingdom large enough to rival that of Lysimachus.

== Death ==
As he hurried his way back from Sindia to his palace for a sacrifice in a four-horse wheeled carriage, the horses became scared. The driver was unable to control them, so Eumelus jumped out of the carriage, but his sword became caught on the wheel and he was dragged along by the carriage and died. He was succeeded by his son Spartocus III.

== See also ==
- List of kings of Cimmerian Bosporus
