= Toreatae =

The Toreatae (Greek: Τορεᾶται, Strabo xi. 2. 11) or Toretae (Greek: Τορεταί, Steph. B. s. v.; Dionys. Per. 682; Plin. vi. 5; Mela, i. 2; Avien. Orb. Terr. 867) were a tribe of the Maeotae in Asiatic Sarmatia. Strabo describes them as living among the Maeotae, Sindi, Dandarii, Agri, Arrechi, Tarpetes, Obidiaceni, Sittaceni, Dosci, and Aspurgiani, among others. (xi. 2. 11)

Ptolemy (v. 9. § 9) mentions a Τορετικὴ ἀκρὰ in Asiatic Sarmatia; and in another passage (iii. 5. § 25) he speaks of the Τορεκκάδαι (Toreccadae) as a people in European Sarmatia, who are perhaps the same as the Toretae or Toreatae.

The Toreatae were one of the Maeotae tribes, who lived in the 1st millennium BC on the eastern and south-eastern coast of the Azov sea. Russian archeologists, historians and ethnographers in the Soviet period concluded that Maeotae was one of the names of the tribes of the Adyghe people (or Circassians): in the Great Soviet Encyclopedia (in the article Adyghe people) was written:

Living in the basin of the river Kuban were some of the tribes of the (Adyghe people), who generally were given the collective name "Maeotae" by ancient historians.

The Maeotae, engaged in farming and fishing, were thought by other Soviet writers to be a mixture of speakers of Adyghe language and an Iranian language. In the 4th–3rd centuries BC many of them were incorporated into the Bosporan kingdom.
