= Macropogones =

The Macropogones (Ancient Greek: Μακροπώγωνες, literally "longbeards") were an ancient people who lived in Abkhazia (and as such likely spoke a Northwest Caucasian language). Their name in Greek means "Big Beards" or "Long Beards". This is a sobriquet and the name they called themselves was likely different.
