= Bosporan Civil War =

Civil War in Bosporian Kingdom

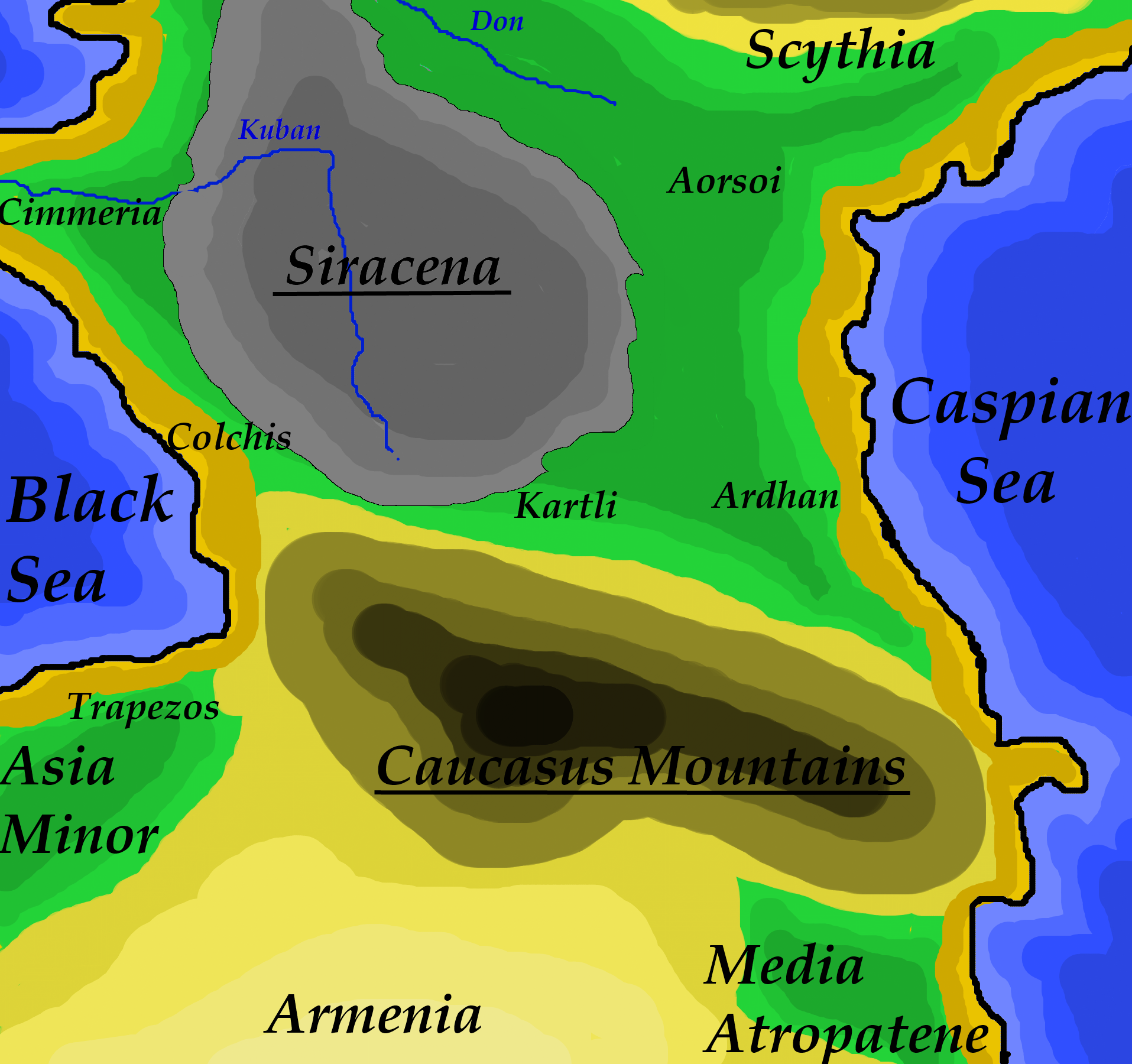
- Map of Cimmeria, Siracena and Scythia
Date	c. 310 – 309 BCE (one year)
Location	Sarmatia, Parts of Cimmerian Bosporus
Result	Siracen victory; Eumelos becomes sole ruler of the Bosporan Kingdom; Both Satyros II and Prytanis are killed; Further expansion of Bosporan territories

Belligerents
The Siraceni	Bosporans; Scythians

Commanders and leaders
Eumelos; Aripharnes	Satyros II †; Meniscus; Prytanis †

Strength
42,000	34,000

Casualties and losses
High	Medium

The Bosporan Civil War was a war of succession that happened in the Bosporan Kingdom sometime between 311 and 308 BCE and lasted for about a year. The casus belli was the death of archon Paerisades I, whose sons disputed the succession. These sons were Satyros II, who claimed the kingdom by virtue of being the eldest, Eumelos, who was another claimant to the throne, and Prytanis, who engaged in battle later on in support of Satyros.

== Sources and dating ==
The most important source on the conflict is provided by the Bibliotheca historica, book 20 chapters 22 to 24, written more than 150 years after the fact by the Greek historian Diodorus Siculus (c. 90–30 BCE).

It is not known exactly when the events narrated by Diodorus happened. The war has been variously dated as having occurred during 309–308 BCE (one year long), within the year 309 BCE, during 311–310 BCE or during 310–309 BCE. In part, the difficulty in determining the period stems from the uncertainty about when king Paerisades I died: in 311 or 310 BCE.

== Background ==
Paerisades, one of the sons of Leukon I, died in 311 or 310 BCE after having ruled 38 years; his eldest son, Satyros II, inherited the kingdom from his father. Eumelos was not pleased with this, and fled Panticapaeum and was given refuge by the ruler of the Sarmatian tribe of Siraces, Aripharnes. After gathering a large army and making an alliance with the neighboring barbarians, Eumelos became a claimant to the Bosporan throne. Upon hearing this, Satyrus immediately left Panticapaeum under Prytanis and sallied out against his brother, cornering him with his baggage wagons in the banks of the river Thatis with Aripharnes.

== Troops ==
=== Bosporan army ===
Units	Numbers
Infantry	20,000 Scythians
Cavalry	10,000 Scythians
Light infantry	2,000 Thracian peltasts
Hoplites	2,000 mercenaries

The Scythians partook in this war because their rivals, the Siraceni, were trying to gain influence in the Bosporus and possibly take some of the land of the Scythians. It is very likely that the mercenaries employed by Satyrus were recruited from Bosporan cities. For some unknown reason, Satyros did not use the citizen Bosporan army, probably due to there being shifting allegiances, and instead left them to protect the cities.

=== Siracen army ===
Units	Numbers
Infantry	22,000 Siracens
Cavalry	20,000 lancers

The Scythians and Sarmatians were most likely competing for influence and territory.

== Course ==
=== Battle of the River Thatis ===
Satyrus mobilized his army into battle formations, placing himself in the center in a phalanx formation. He had stationed his Greek mercenaries and Thracian peltasts to his right, and his Scythian allies to his left. Satyrus rounded his best troops and charged at Aripharnes, who was opposite him, in the center of the enemy line. The two sides sustained many losses, but Satyrus was able to rout Aripharnes and he gave chase to kill the fleeing enemy but stopped when he received news that his brother Eumelos was winning at the right wing, and that his mercenaries had begun to flee. He turned around and aided his own troops and was able to rout his brother's entire army.

=== Siege of Siracena ===
After the routing of their army, Aripharnes and Eumelos fled to Siracena, the Siracen capital and fortified city. Satyrus gave chase to his brother, but made the observations that the city was situated on the river Thatis, it was surrounded by thick forests and long cliffs and only had two artificial entry ways: one through the main gate, and another through the palace of Aripharnes, both of which were heavily defended. Knowing that it would be suicide to attack the main city, Satyrus decided to let his army plunder the nearby villages and attained from this many prisoners. Satyrus then ordered some of his men to start cutting some trees to make a pathway from their camp, to the main gate. While this was carried out, Aripharnes believed that the only way of safety was victory and stationed archers on both sides of his city. Satyrus's men, while cutting the trees, started to take fire from Siracen wall defenders, who were throwing spears and arrows at them. After four days of cutting, on the fourth day, his army made it to the Siracen walls, but had sustained many losses getting there. Meniscus, the mercenary Greek captain, fought with bravery and boldness when he entered the city, but had to retreat when he was overcome by enemy forces. Upon seeing this, Satyrus rushed to his aid and fought bravely, but was struck in his right shoulder by a spear and was carried back to his tent. Satyrus died that night. Meniscus, seeing no point in carrying out the siege, ended it and took Satyrus's body to Gargaza to be sent off to Panticapaeum.

=== Later battles ===
Prytanis, who held a great funeral for his elder brother, hurried to Gargaza and took both the royal power and control of the army. Eumelos, perhaps testing his fortunes, sent envoys to Prytanis to discuss partition of the kingdom between themselves but to this, Prytanis declined. After that, Prytanis left a garrison in Gargaza and hurried back to Panticapaeum to seize the royalties that he was entitled to.

Gargaza

While Prytanis was away, Eumelos and perhaps Aripharnes took the chance and attacked Gargaza, capturing it in the process. He also plundered various towns neighboring Gargaza and its land.

Battle of Lake Maeotis Prytanis sallied out against his brother, but was defeated by Eumelos. He surrendered his throne to Eumelos, in exchange for his life. Upon re-entering Panticapaeum, the capital city of the rulers of the Bosporus, he attempted to regain his kingdom, but was overpowered and fled to a place called "The Gardens" which may mean Kepoi, which was a place gifted to Gylon of Cerameis, the grandfather of Demosthenes by Satyrus I for giving them Nymphaeum over a century earlier in the Bosporan wars of expansion, Prytanis and Eumelos's great-grandfather. Here he was killed by Eumelos.

== Aftermath ==
Eumelos became ruler of the Bosporan Kingdom after solidifying his reign by killing the families and friends of his brothers, and re-took various colonies that had been lost in the years before his rule such as Tanais. He successfully cleared the Black Sea of pirates and gained much fame throughout the Bosporus. He expanded his realm so much, that it could rival that of Lysimachus.
