= Achaei =

Ancient people of Scythia

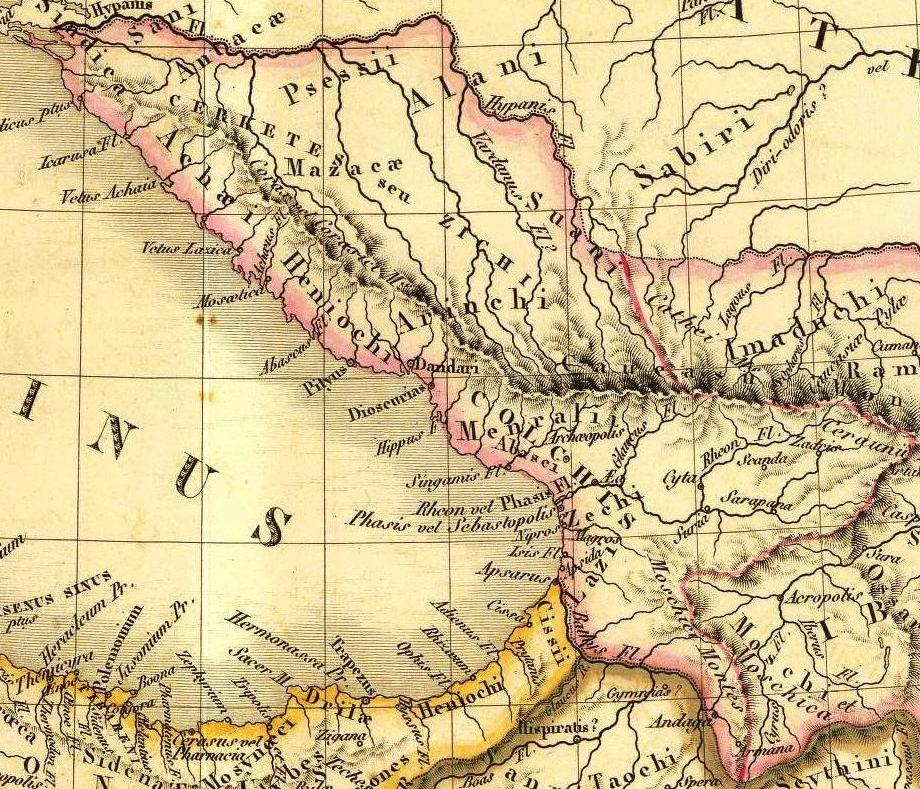

The Achaei were an ancient people of Scythia, mentioned by Strabo (11.2, together with the Zygoi, Heniochi, and Cercetae and Macropogones) and by Pliny (4.26.2). Pliny mentions a Portus Achaeorum at the mouths of the Danube. The name has been interpreted to mean "river dwellers", from an Indo-European word for "water" (Latin aqua, Old High German aha; Wissowa, Pauly's Real-Encyclopadie s. v. Achaei)
