= Aripharnes =

Aripharnes The Thataean
- King of the Siracae
- Reign: c. 310-309 BC

Aripharnes the Thataean (Ancient Greek: Ἀριφάρνης, romanized: Ariphárnēs; fl. 310–309 BC) was king of the Sarmatian tribe of Siraces and took part in the First Bosporan Civil War of 310-309 between king Satyros II and his brother Eumelos, a pretender to the throne.

== Succession ==
At first, all three claimants to the throne, Satyros, Prytanis, and Eumelos sought Aripharnes to back them to the throne. Aripharnes then ordered each of the lads to hurl a javelin into their father's corpse. Satyros and Prytanis did so, but Eumelos refused. There, Aripharnes proclaimed Eumelos "King of the Cimmerians".

== Military history ==
Aripharnes and Eumelos fought Satyrus at the Battle of River Thatis, but they were defeated by the numerically inferior Satyric army. Afterward, he retreated with Eumelos to his settlement Siracena.

The settlement was besieged by Satyros and after a lengthy siege, he was mortally wounded. Meniscus, the mercenary captain in charge of Satyros's mercenaries, broke off the siege and took the body of Satyros to Panticapaeum for a royal burial. After this war, Aripharnes is no longer mentioned during Eumelos's later campaigns as king of the Bosporus.
