= Dandarii =

Ancient people from the Palus Maeotis, present-day Russia

The Dandarii or Dandaridae were an ancient people dwelling along the Palus Maeotis in antiquity. Strabo describes them as living among the Maeotae, Sindi, Toreatae, Agri, Arrechi, Tarpetes, Obidiaceni, Sittaceni, Dosci, and Aspurgiani, among others. The Dandarii were one of the Maeotae tribes, who lived in the 1st millennium BC on the east and the south-eastern coast of the Azov sea. In the Great Soviet Encyclopedia, they were concluded to have been one of the ancestors to the Circassians. Maeotae were engaged in farming and fishing. In the 4th–3rd centuries BC many of the Maeotae tribes were included into the Bosporan Kingdom.
