= Moschia =

Region of the Caucasus Mountains

Moschia (Meskheti, possibly related to Mushki) is a mountainous region of Georgia between Iberia, Armenia, and Colchis. The Moschian Mountains were the connecting chain between the Caucasus and Anti-Taurus Mountains. The people of that area were known as the Moschi. They may have been connected to the Mushki.

Wilhelm Gesenius suggested that the Moschi were descended from the Biblical Meshech tribe.

Strabo mentions the Moschian Mountains as joining the Caucasus (Geography, 11.2.1). He says that the Moschian country lay above the rivers Phasis, Glaucus, and Hippus (Geography, 11.2.17). In it "lies the temple of Leucothea, founded by Phrixus, and the oracle of Phrixus, where a ram is never sacrificed; it was once rich, but it was robbed in our time by Pharnaces, and a little later by Mithridates of Pergamum." (ibid).

According to the renowned scholar of the Caucasian studies Cyril Toumanoff, the Moschians were the early proto-Georgian tribes which were integrated into the first early Georgian state of Iberia.

Mushki are mentioned in the cuneiform tablets of Tiglath-Pileser I of Assyria dating to 1115–1100 B.C. He led a campaign against them in the North of Commagene and mountains of Georgia and Armenia. According to Igor Diakonoff, the Mushki possibly were speakers of Proto-Armenian, who carried their language from the Balkans across Asia Minor, mixing with Hurrians (and Urartians) and Luwians along the way. However, the connection between the Mushki and Armenian languages is quite unclear and many modern scholars have rejected a direct linguistic relationship. Additionally, genetic research does not support significant admixture into the Armenian nation after 1200 BCE, making the Mushki, if they indeed migrated from a Balkan or western Anatolian homeland during or after the Bronze Age Collapse, unlikely candidates for the Proto-Armenians. However, as others have placed (at least the Eastern) Mushki or Meskhi homeland in South Caucasus region mostly speaking Georgian language as their native.

Medieval maps mention with Moschi region Armenian and Iberian parts.

== See also ==
- Mushki
- Meskheti
