= Siraces =

Ancient Sarmatian tribe

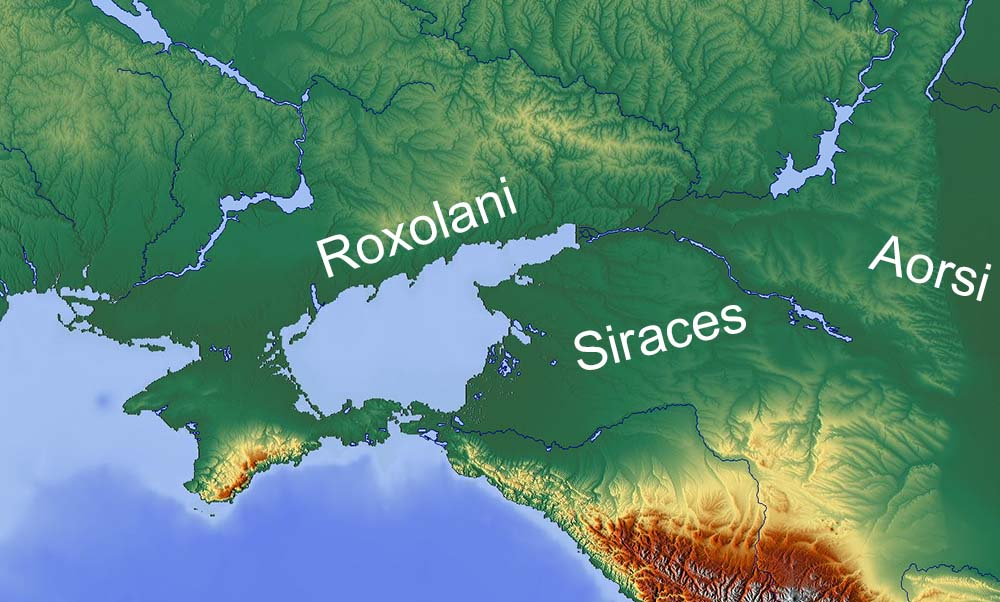
Siraces and neighbouring major tribes in the 4th century BC.

The Siraces (Greek: Sirakoi, Latin: Siraci, also Siraceni and Seraci) were a hellenized Sarmatian tribe that inhabited Sarmatia Asiatica; the coast of Achardeus at the Black Sea north of the Caucasus Mountains, Siracena is mentioned by Tacitus as one of their settlements. They were said to be relatively small nation but with great morale. They were neighbours to the later enemy tribe of Aorsi.

They migrated from the Caspian Sea to the Black Sea region. By the late 4th century, they had occupied lands between the Caucasus mountains and the Don, becoming masters of the Kuban region. They were the first Sarmatian tribe to have contact with the Hellenic groups on the coast of the Black Sea.

In 310–309 BC, their king Aripharnes took part in the Bosporan Civil War and lost at the battle of the River Thatis (a tributary of the Kuban river).

In the 1st century BC during the rule of Pharnaces II of Pontus, King of Siraces Abeacus organized 20,000 horses after the Roman occupation of the Kingdom of Pontus (63–62 BC).

They and the Aorsi were merchants who traded with goods of Babylonia and India through the Armenians and Medes, with camels. They profited greatly from this, seen in their clothing attributed with much gold.

King Zorsines fought in the Bosporus under Mithridates, the king of Armenia, against the Dandaridae. Their ally Mithridates later turned against the Romans who had put Mithridates on the throne in 41. Mithridates eluded the Romans and recovered his kingdom. In the Bosporan War, The Aorsi under Prince Eunones, sent by Aquila and Cotys is sent after Mithridates and his lands, fights with Zorsines and sieges Uspe in 49 AD (The town offers 10,000 slaves for their capitulation but the assault continues as the Romans decline), Zorsines finally decides to leave Mithridates to rule his paternal lands, after giving hostages to the Romans and thus making peace. He acknowledged Roman superiority before the image of Emperor Claudius and the power of the Siraces is greatly weakened.

They were the most hellenized of the Sarmatians, and maintained good relations with the Bosporans.

Ptolemy mentions their colony in Sinai in the second century. In 193 AD, after another conflict in the Bosporus, the Siraces disappears from the history.

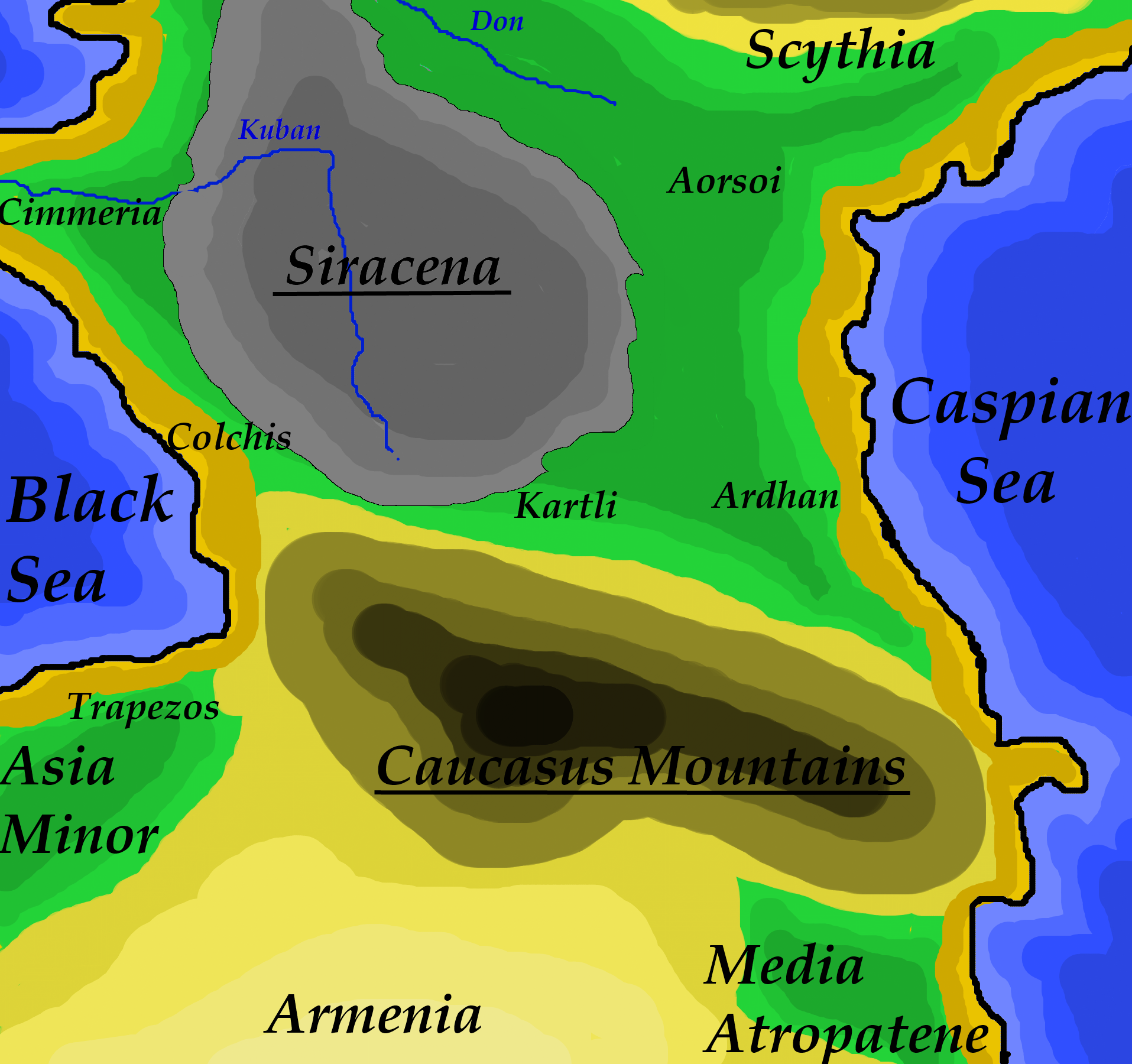
Map depicting the Caucasus region around 400 B.C. Siracena, land of the Siraces, is shown in grey, according to its approximate greatest extent.

== Kings ==
- Aripharnes, fl. 310–309 BC
- Abeacus, fl. 63–47 BC
- Zorsines, fl. 41–49 AD

== See also ==
- Cherkessk (Siracena)
- Circassia
- Circassians
