= Maeotians =

Historical ethnic group of the Sea of Azov

Map of the Roman empire under Hadrian (r. 117–138 AD), showing the location of the Maeotae on the eastern shore of the eponymous Latin: Palus Maeotis (Sea of Azov)

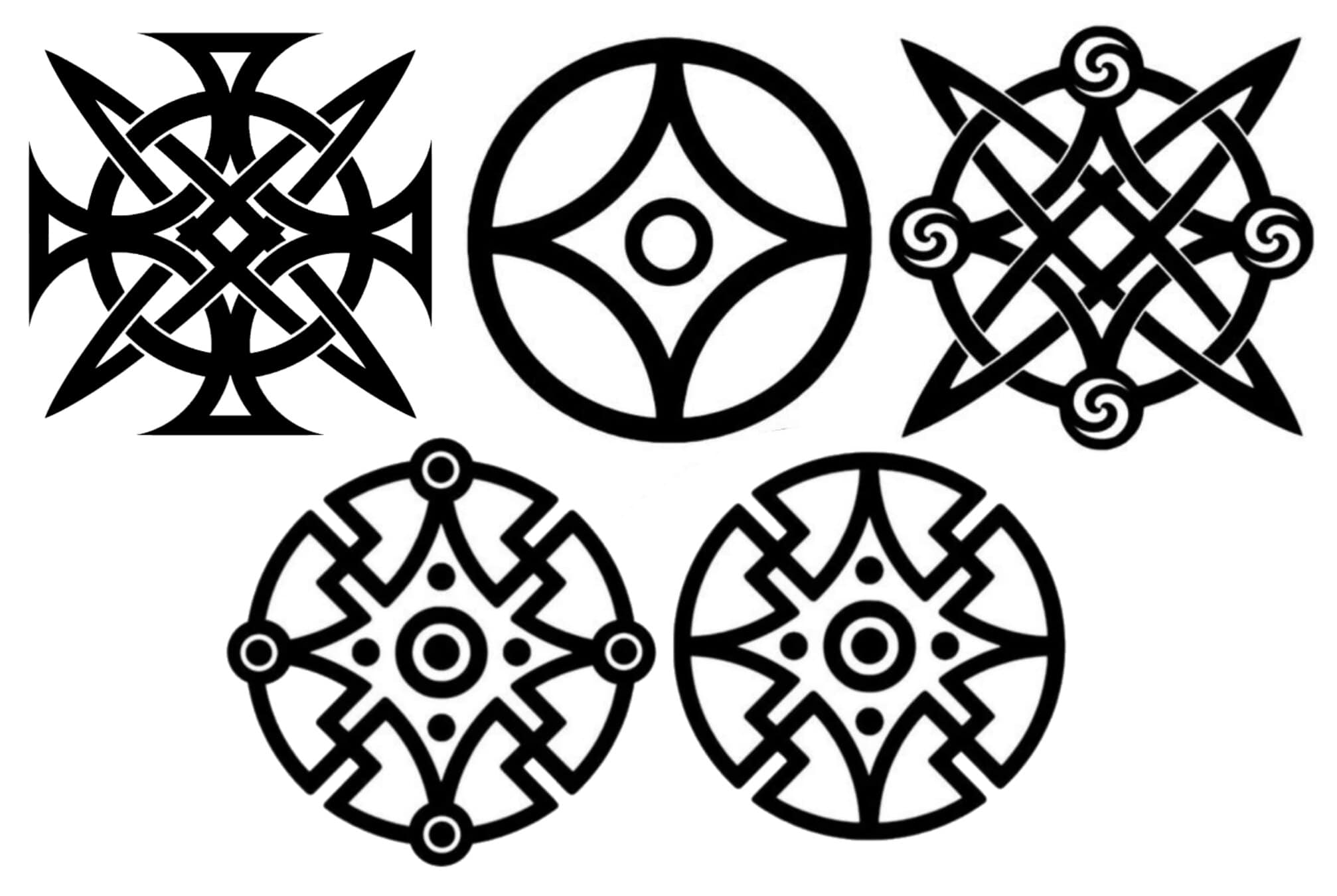
Maeotan symbol

The Maeotians Adyghe: Мыут1э, romanized: Mıwt'e(Ancient Greek: Μαιῶται, romanized: Maiōtai; Latin: Maeōtae) were an ancient people dwelling along the eastern and southeastern shores of the Sea of Azov in the North Caucasus, which was known in antiquity as the "Maeotian Swamp" (Latin: Palus Maeotis), and along the middle course of the Kuban River. They were settled farmers and fishers, in contrast to their nomadic neighbors, and from the 4th century BC onward many of the Maeotian tribes were subjects of the Bosporan Kingdom, in whose royal titles they appear as "the Maeotians" or "all the Maeotians".

== Name ==
The name of the people derives from that of the sea: "Maeotian" was in origin a label for the tribes living around the Maeotis, above all along its eastern coast.

The word carried different senses in different contexts. Gardiner-Garden distinguishes three in the sources of the 4th century BC: a broad territorial label for the peoples around the Maeotis; the name of the coastal tribes enumerated by Strabo; and a narrow administrative sense in the usage of the Bosporan chancery, where "the Maeotians" designates the lesser tribes of the Kuban region as distinct from the Sindi.

== Tribes ==
Strabo names among the Maeotians the Sindi, the Dandarii, the Toreatae, the Agri, the Arrechi, the Tarpetes, the Obidiaceni, the Sittaceni, the Dosci, "and many others". Of these, the Sindi are the best attested and were probably the dominant people of the region. The Bosporan royal inscriptions name the Toretae, Dandarii, Psessi, Thateis and Doschoi individually, alongside a collective "(all) the Maeotians" for the remainder.

Whether particular peoples counted as Maeotian was already disputed in antiquity. Hellanicus and Pseudo-Scylax distinguish the Sindi from the Maeotians, while Pseudo-Scymnus and Strabo treat them as a Maeotian people; Stephanus of Byzantium records that "some say the Sindian race is an offshoot of the Maiotai". The Ixomatae, the people of the princess Tirgatao, are Maeotian in Polyaenus and in Demetrius of Callatis, but Ephorus counted them a Sauromatian people.

== Language and origins ==
The language of the Maeotians, and even its language family, is uncertain; to judge from the toponymy of their country, they were not of Iranian stock. The Cambridge Ancient History reports two main views: that they were of Cimmerian ancestry, akin to the Thracians, or that they were Caucasian aboriginals under Iranian overlordship. One princess of the Ixomatae was called Tirgatao, a name that has been compared to Tirgutawiya, a name on a tablet discovered in Hurrian Alalakh.

Soviet archaeologists, historians, and ethnographers concluded that the Maeotians were among the ancestors of the Circassian (Adyghe) people. (Note: "The Kuban tribes (Adyghe people) are usually referred to by the ancient writers under the collective name Maeotae") (Note: "The study of language, toponymy and onomastics of the north-Western Caucasus gives the grounds referred ancient Maeotae population to the Adyghe- Kassogians ethnic array, which is also in line with archeological monuments Maeotae culture and its links with the subsequent cultures of medieval Adyghe (Circassians).") The modern Adyghe name of the people is МыутIэхэр, Mıwt'əxər. In the 19th century Karl Eichwald claimed that the Maeotians originated as a "Hindu" (Indian) colony, a view rejected by scholars already in his own time.

== Society and economy ==
The Maeotians were settled agriculturalists and fishers who lived in earthworks and open settlements on the Taman Peninsula and along the middle Kuban. According to Strabo, they lived partly on fish and partly from agriculture, but were as warlike as their nomadic neighbors; they were at times tributary to the rulers of Tanais (when Tanais itself was not ruled by the Bosporans) and at other times to the Bosporans, and rose in revolt from time to time.

In the Kuban region, the Maeotians lived under the domination of successive steppe overlords. Their subordination is visible archaeologically: the ruling Scythians, and in Sindica the Sindian elite, were buried in richly furnished kurgans, while the Maeotian population used poorly equipped flat cemeteries.

== History ==
The earliest known references to the Maeotians are in the logographers of the 5th century BC: Hecataeus of Miletus and Hellanicus of Lesbos. Herodotus mentions the rivers flowing through the land of the Maeotians into the Maeotis (4.123).

In the early 4th century BC, the Maeotian tribes fought a major war against the Bosporan Kingdom and its Sindian subjects. After the Sindian king Hecataeus repudiated his Maeotian wife Tirgatao, she roused her people, the Ixomatae, and other tribes of the Maeotis to a destructive war against both kingdoms, ended only under Gorgippus by supplication and gifts (Tirgatao's war).

After the Bosporan annexation of Sindica under Leucon I, probably in the 380s BC, the Maeotian tribes of the Kuban were progressively incorporated into the Bosporan state: Leucon ruled the Toretae, Dandarii and Psessi as king, and under Paerisades I the royal style expanded to "king of the Sindi and all the Maeotians". Strabo reports revolts of the subordinated Maeotians. Epigraphy provides probable evidence of one such revolt under Paerisades: in one of his inscriptions (IosPE II.8) the tribal name preceding "Thateis" has been erased, which Marcus Tod suggested may record a successful rising, and Gardiner-Garden proposes that the rebels were the far-off Doschoi, who are associated with the Thateis in another inscription (IosPE II.347). In later times, especially under Pharnaces II, Asander, and Polemon I, the Bosporan Kingdom extended as far as the Tanais; under Aspurgus (early 1st century AD) the royal titulature still lists the Sindi and Maeotians, now joined by the Tarpetes and the people of Tanais.

== Sources ==
- Gardiner-Garden, John R. (1986). "Fourth Century Conceptions of Maiotian Ethnography". Historia: Zeitschrift für Alte Geschichte. 35 (2): 192–225. JSTOR 4435962.
- Sulimirski, Tadeusz; Taylor, T. F. (1991). "The Scythians". In Boardman, John; Edwards, I. E. S.; Hammond, N. G. L.; Sollberger, E.; Walker, C. B. F. (eds.). The Cambridge Ancient History. Vol. 3.2. Cambridge: Cambridge University Press. pp. 560–590. ISBN 978-1-139-05429-4.
- Tokhtas'ev, Sergei R. (2006). "The Bosporus and Sindike in the Era of Leukon I: New Epigraphic Publications". Ancient Civilizations from Scythia to Siberia. 12 (1–2). Brill: 1–62.
