= Maeotian Swamp =

Ancient name for marshes in modern southern Russia

Coordinates: 45.305°N 36.468°E

The Maeotian Swamp or Maeotian Marshes (Ancient Greek: ἡ Μαιῶτις λίμνη, hē Maiōtis límnē, literally Maeotian Lake; Latin: Palus Maeotis) was a name applied in antiquity variously to the swamps at the mouth of the Tanais River in Scythia (the modern Don in southern Russia) and to the entire Sea of Azov which it forms there. The sea was also known as the Maeotian Lake (Ancient Greek: ἡ Μαιῶτις λίμνη, hē Maiōtis límnē; Latin: Lacus Maeotis) among other names. The people who lived around the sea were known as the Maeotians, although it remains unclear which was named for which. The Kerch Strait joins the Sea of Azov and the Black Sea.

The Ixomates were a tribe of the Maeotae. According to Strabo, to the south of the Maeotae, east of the Crimea, were the Sindes, their lands known as Sindica. The Iazyges, a Sarmatian tribe, were originally located on the Maeotis.

The (generally considered to be untrustworthy) 4th-century source Historia Augusta claims the Roman emperor Marcus Claudius Tacitus secured a victory over the Alans near the marshes during his brief reign in 275 and 276. (Note: "His first care after being made emperor was to put to death all who had killed Aurelian, good and bad alike, although he had already been avenged. Then with wisdom and courage he crushed the barbarians—for they had broken forth in great numbers from the district of Lake Maeotis. The Maeotidae, in fact, were flocking together under the pretext of assembling by command of Aurelian for the Persian War, in order that, should necessity demand it, they might render aid to our troops.")

Jordanes, in his 6th-century history of the Goths, relates a tradition concerning the migration of the Huns into Scythia and the Maeotian swamp. Drawing on the earlier historian Priscus, he writes that the Huns settled on the eastern bank of the Maeotian swamp, where they made a living by hunting. One day, hunters pursuing game saw a doe enter the swamp and followed it as it guided them through a swamp they had once believed to be impassable. On the other side, they discovered Scythia. These hunters returned and persuaded their kin to cross by the same route. Jordanes relates that "like a whirlwind of nations [the Huns] swept across the great swamp," conquered the Alpidzuri, Alcildzuri, Itimari, Tuncarsi and Boisci, and eventually subdued the Alans.
