= Chernogorovka-Novocherkassk complex =

Archaeological complex

The Chernogorovka-Novocherkassk complex (Ukrainian: Чорногорівська група, romanized: Chornohorivsjka hrupa), sometimes conventionally called the Cimmerian culture, is an archaeological complex associated with the first steppe nomads of ancient eastern and central Europe, especially with the Cimmerians.

== Phases ==
The Chernogorovka-Novocherkassk complex covered two phases:

- the Chernogorovka phase, from c. 900 to c. 750 BC, named after Chernogorovka (Chornohorivka), in Siversk, Ukraine
- the Novocherkassk phase, from c. 750 to c. 650 BC, named after Novocherkassk in western Russia

== History ==
=== Origins ===
The Chernogorovka-Novocherkassk complex originated in the first wave of nomadic populations who originated in the parts of Central Asia corresponding to eastern Kazakhstan or the Altai-Sayan region, and who had, beginning in the 10th century BC and lasting until the 9th to 8th centuries BC, migrated westwards into the Pontic-Caspian Steppe regions, where they formed new tribal confederations which constituted the Chernogorovka-Novocherkassk complex.

The arrival of the Central Asian formative element of the Chernogorovka-Novocherkassk complex in Europe was thus part of the larger process of westwards movement of Central Asian Iranic nomads towards South-East and Central Europe which lasted from the 1st millennium BC to the 1st millennium AD, and to which also later participated other Iranic nomads such as the Scythians, Sauromatians, and Sarmatians.

True nomadic pastoralism emerged at the beginning of the first millennium BC due to climatic changes that made the steppe environment of Central Asia and Siberia colder and more arid than before. The decline in solar activity during the 9th century BC turned the arid, inhospitable desert of south-central Siberia into lush, resource-rich grassland capable of supporting massive herds of grazing animals. These changes transformed the sedentary Bronze Age farmers, who relied on a mixed economy, into nomadic herders. Consequently, by the 9th century BC, all settlements of the sedentary Bronze Age populations in the steppe had disappeared, thereby fostering population mobility and the formation of warrior units needed to protect herds and occupy new territories. These climatic conditions, in turn, prompted nomadic groups to become transhumant herders, constantly moving their herds from one pasture to another across the steppe, and to seek better grazing lands to the west, in Ciscaucasia and the forest-steppe regions of Western Eurasia.

The archaeological and historical records regarding the migrations which formed the Chernogorovka-Novocherkassk complex are however scarce and permit to sketch only a very broad outline of this complex development.

The Chernogorovka-Novocherkassk complex thus developed natively in the North Pontic region over the course of the 9th to mid-7th centuries BC from elements which had earlier arrived from Central Asia. Therefore, three main cultural influences are contributed to the development of the Chernogorovka-Novocherkassk complex:

- present in the development of the Chernogorovka-Novocherkassk complex is a strong impact of the native Belozerka culture, especially in the form of pottery styles and burial traditions;
- the two other influences were of foreign origin:
  - attesting of the Inner Asian origin from the Minusinsk region accompanied by connections with the Ananyino culture, a strong material influence from the Altai, Arzhan and Karasuk cultures from Central Asia and Siberia is visible in the Chernogorovka-Novocherkassk complex; of Inner Asian origin were especially dagger and arrowhead types, horse gear such as bits with stirrup-shaped terminals, deer stone-like carved stelae and Animal Style art;
  - in addition to this Central Asian influence, the Kuban culture of Ciscaucasia also played an important contribution in the development of the Chernogorovka-Novocherkassk complex, especially regarding the adoption of Kuban culture-types of mace heads and bimetallic daggers.

The Chernogorovka-Novocherkassk complex thus developed natively in the North Pontic region over the course of the 9th to mid-7th centuries BC from elements which had earlier arrived from Central Asia, due to which it itself exhibited similarities with the other early nomadic cultures of the Eurasian steppe and forest steppe which existed before the 7th century BC, such as the Aržan culture, so that these various pre-Scythian early nomadic cultures were thus part of a unified Aržan-Chernogorovka cultural layer originating from Central Asia.

=== Spread ===
==== In Europe ====
Thanks to their development of highly mobile mounted nomadic pastoralism and the creation of effective weapons suited to equestrian warfare, all based on equestrianism, these nomads from the Pontic-Caspian Steppes were able to gradually infiltrate into Central and Southeast Europe and therefore expand deep into this region over a very long period of time.

Graves of both the Chernogorovka (Chornohorivka, in Siversk, Ukraine) and Novocherkassk phases of the complex are spread across a large area ranging from north-eastern Bulgaria and Moldavia in the west through Ukraine and Crimea and up to the Kuban and Volga-Kama regions in the east. The Chernogorovka-Novocherkassk complex thus covered the area ranging from Central Europe and the Hungarian Plain in the west to the Pontic and Ciscaucasian Steppes in the east.

In the 8th century BC, a part of the Chernogorovka-Novocherkassk complex expanded into the Pannonian Steppe, where it contributed to the formation of the Mezőcsát culture. This in turn allowed the Chernogorovka-Novocherkassk complex itself to strongly influence the Hallstatt culture of Central Europe: among these influences was the adoption of trousers, which were not used by the native populations of Central Europe before the arrival of the Central Asian steppe nomads.

==== In West Asia ====
Another direction of expansion of the Arzhan-Chernogorovka cultural layer was represented by the movements of the Cimmerians and Scythians to the south of the Caucasus into West Asia during the 8th to 7th centuries BC.

=== End ===
The arrival of the Scythians and their establishment in this region in the 7th century BC corresponded to a disturbance of the development of Chernogorovka-Novocherkassk complex, which was thus replaced through a continuous process over the course of c. 750 to c. 600 BC by the early Scythian culture in southern Europe, which itself nevertheless still showed links to the Chernogorovka-Novocherkassk complex.

== Characteristics ==
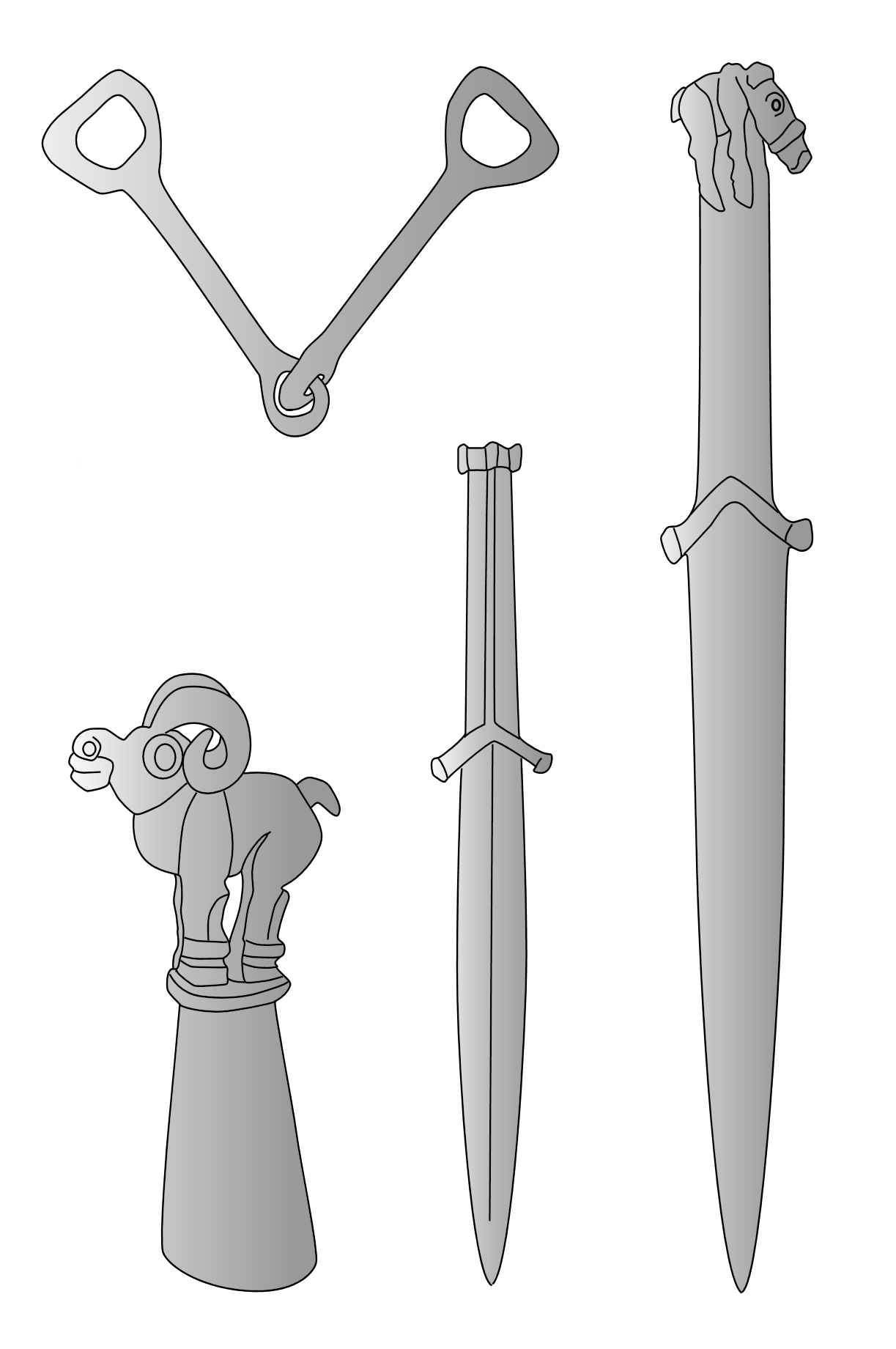
Arzhan I bronze artifacts: horsebit with horseshoe shape, decorative pole cover and daggers, circa 800 BCE.

Due to the Central Asian contribution in its formation, the Chernogorovka-Novocherkassk complex exhibited similarities with the other early nomadic cultures of the Eurasian steppe and forest-steppe which existed before the 7th century BC, such as the Aržan culture, so that these various pre-Scythian early nomadic cultures were thus part of a unified Aržan-Chernogorovka cultural layer originating from Central Asia, with the early Scythian culture being materially indistinguishable from the Chernogorovka-Novocherkassk complex.

The characteristic objects of the Chernogorovka-Novocherkassk complex are Kabardino-Pyatigorsk daggers, Ciscaucasian horse-bits, specific arrowhead shapes, and less specific spearheads. Many decorative parts of horse harnesses and personal ornaments are rare in the Chernogorovka-Novocherkassk complex, while open-work rattles were used for rituals, and Maltese crosses had a religious significance.

The transition from the Chernogorovka to Novocherkassk phases was marked by a change of horse gear styles.

=== Population ===
The peoples of the Chernogorovka-Novocherkassk complex shared a common culture and origin with the Scythians and lived an equestrian nomadic pastoralist way of life similar to that of the Scythians, which is reflected by how West Asian sources mentioned Cimmerian arrows, bows and horse equipment, which are typical of steppe nomads.

Thus, the "mare-milkers" (Ancient Greek: ιππημολγοι, romanized: hippēmolgoi) and "milk consumers" (Ancient Greek: γαλακτοφαγοι, romanized: galaktophagoi) from Homer's Odyssey might have been a reference to Chernogorovka-Novocherkassk peoples such as the Cimmerians, who had this lifestyle in common with the Scythians, as attested by Hesiod's description of the Scythians as living in the same way.

== Distribution ==
The Chernogorovka-Novocherkassk complex covered a wide territory ranging from Central Europe and the Pannonian Plain in the west to Caucasia in the east, including present-day Southern Russia.

== Identification ==
The Chernogorovka-Novocherkassk complex corresponds to a peoples confederations of Iranic equestrian nomads such as:

- the Agathyrsi in the Pontic Steppe;
- the Cimmerians in the Caspian Steppe,
- and possibly the Sigynnae in the Pannonian Steppe.

=== Thraco-Cimmerian culture ===
Chernogorovka-Novocherkassk type remains found in the eastern parts of Central Europe, especially in Transylvania and on the Hungarian Plain were previously designated as "Thraco-Cimmerian" due to their then identification with possible westwards migrations of the Cimmerians.

== Sources ==
- Adalı, Selim Ferruh (2017). "Cimmerians and the Scythians: the Impact of Nomadic Powers on the Assyrian Empire and the Ancient Near East". In Kim, Hyun Jin; Vervaet, Frederik Juliaan; Adalı, Selim Ferruh (eds.). Eurasian Empires in Antiquity and the Early Middle Ages Contact and Exchange between the Graeco- Roman World, Inner Asia and China. Cambridge: Cambridge University Press. pp. 60–82. ISBN 978-1-107-19041-2.
- Batty, Roger (2007). Rome and the Nomads: The Pontic-Danubian Realm in Antiquity. Oxford: Oxford University Press. ISBN 978-0-198-14936-1.
- Bouzek, Jan [in Hungarian] (2001). "Cimmerians and Early Scythians: the Transition from Geometric to Orientalising Style in the Pontic Area". In Tsetskhladze, G.R. (ed.). North Pontic Archaeology: Recent Discoveries and Studies. Leiden, Netherlands: Brill Publishers. pp. 33–44. ISBN 978-9-004-12041-9.
- Cunliffe, Barry (2019). The Scythians: Nomad Warriors of the Steppe. Oxford: Oxford University Press. ISBN 978-0-198-82012-3.
- Ivantchik, Askold (2001). "The Current State of the Cimmerian Problem". Ancient Civilizations from Scythia to Siberia. 7 (3): 307–339. doi:10.1163/15700570152758043.
- Ivantchik, Askold (2018). "Scythians". Encyclopædia Iranica. New York City, United States: Encyclopædia Iranica Foundation; Brill Publishers.
- Jacobson, Esther (1995). The Art of the Scythians: The Interpenetration of Cultures at the Edge of the Hellenic World. Handbuch der Orientalistik. Leiden, Netherlands: Brill Publishers. ISBN 978-9-004-09856-5.
- Melyukova, A. I. (1990). "The Scythians and Sarmatians". In Sinor, Denis (ed.). The Cambridge History of Early Inner Asia. Cambridge, United Kingdom: Cambridge University Press. pp. 97–117. ISBN 978-0-521-24304-9.
- Melyukova, Anna I. (1995). "2. Scythians of Southeastern Europe". In Davis-Kimball, Jeannine; Bashilov, Vladimir A.; Yablonsky, Leonid T. [in Russian] (eds.). Nomads of the Eurasian Steppes in the Early Iron Age. Berkeley, United States: Zinat Press. pp. 27–61. ISBN 978-1-885979-00-1.
- Olbrycht, Marek Jan (2000a). "The Cimmerian Problem Re-Examined: the Evidence of the Classical Sources". In Pstrusińska, Jadwiga [in Polish]; Fear, Andrew (eds.). Collectanea Celto-Asiatica Cracoviensia. Kraków: Księgarnia Akademicka. pp. 71–100. ISBN 978-8-371-88337-8.
- Olbrycht, Marek Jan (2000b). "Remarks on the Presence of Iranian Peoples in Europe and Their Asiatic Relations". In Pstrusińska, Jadwiga [in Polish]; Fear, Andrew (eds.). Collectanea Celto-Asiatica Cracoviensia. Kraków: Księgarnia Akademicka. pp. 101–140. ISBN 978-8-371-88337-8.
- Petrenko, Vladimir G. (1995). "1. Scythian Culture in the North Caucasus". In Davis-Kimball, Jeannine; Bashilov, Vladimir A.; Yablonsky, Leonid T. [in Russian] (eds.). Nomads of the Eurasian Steppes in the Early Iron Age. Berkeley, United States: Zinat Press. pp. 5–25. ISBN 978-1-885979-00-1.
- Sulimirski, Tadeusz; Taylor, T. F. (1991). "The Scythians". In Boardman, John; Edwards, I. E. S.; Hammond, N. G. L.; Sollberger, E.; Walker, C. B. F. (eds.). The Assyrian and Babylonian Empires and other States of the Near East, from the Eighth to the Sixth Centuries B.C. The Cambridge Ancient History. Vol. 3. Cambridge, United Kingdom: Cambridge University Press. pp. 547–590. ISBN 978-1-139-05429-4.
- Tokhtas’ev, Sergei R. [in Russian] (1991). "Cimmerians". Encyclopædia Iranica. New York City, United States: Encyclopædia Iranica Foundation; Brill Publishers.
