= Sigynnae =

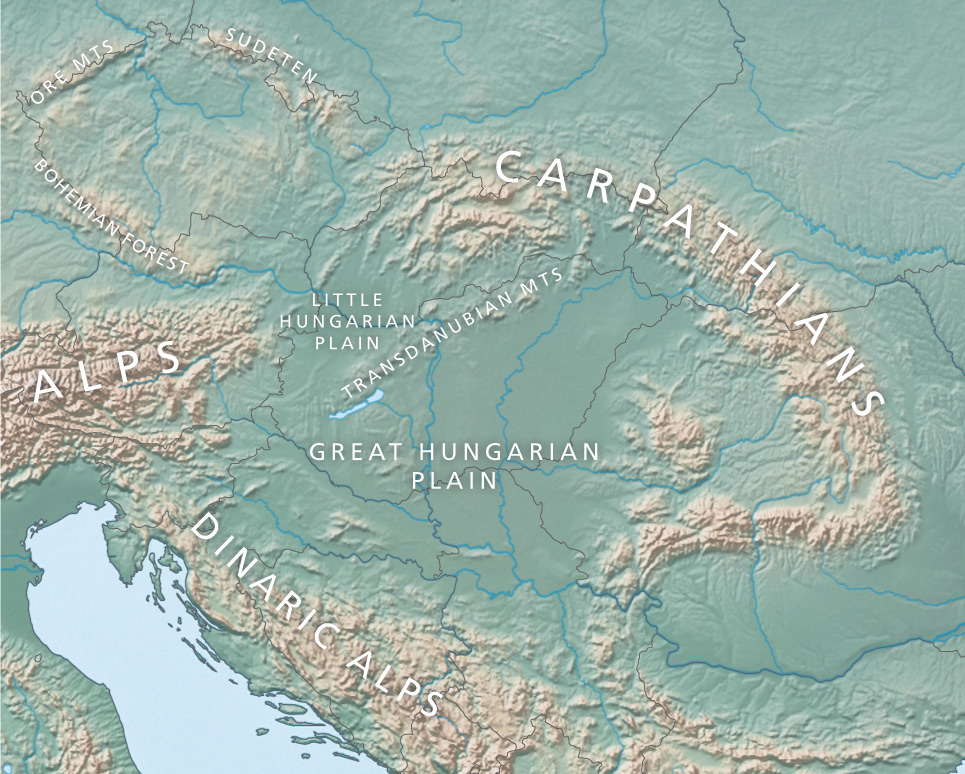
- The Sigynnae lived in the Great Hungarian Plain to the east and north of the Danube

Regions with significant populations
- Pannonian Basin (8th to 4th centuries BC)

Religion
- Scythian religion ?

Related ethnic groups
- Agathyrsi, Cimmerians

The Sigynnae (Ancient Greek: Σιγύνναι, romanized: Sigúnnai; Latin: Sigynnae) were an obscure nomadic people of antiquity belonging to the Scythian cultures who lived in the region corresponding to parts of present-day Hungary.

== History ==
The arrival of the Sigynnae in Europe was part of the larger process of westwards movement of Central Asian Iranic nomads towards Southeast and Central Europe which lasted from the 1st millennium BC to the 1st millennium AD, and to which also later participated other Iranic nomads such as the Cimmerians, Scythians, Sauromatians, and Sarmatians.

=== Beginning of steppe nomadism ===
The formation of genuine nomadic pastoralism itself happened in the early 1st millennium BC due to climatic changes which caused the environment in the Central Asian and Siberian steppes to become cooler and drier than before. These changes caused the sedentary mixed farmers of the Bronze Age to become nomadic pastoralists, so that by the 9th century BC all the steppe settlements of the sedentary Bronze Age populations had disappeared, and therefore led to the development of population mobility and the formation of warrior units necessary to protect herds and take over new areas.

These climatic conditions in turn caused the nomadic groups to become transhumant pastoralists constantly moving their herds from one pasture to another in the steppe, and to search for better pastures to the west, in Ciscaucasia and the forest steppe regions of western Eurasia.

=== The Chernogorovka-Novocherkassk complex ===
The Sigynnae themselves originated as a section of the first wave of the nomadic populations who originated in the parts of Central Asia corresponding to eastern Kazakhstan or the Altai-Sayan region, and who had, beginning in the 10th century BC and lasting until the 9th to 8th centuries BC, migrated westwards into the Pontic-Caspian Steppe regions, where they formed new tribal confederations which constituted the Chernogorovka-Novocherkassk complex.

Among these tribal confederations were possibly the Sigynnae in the Pannonian Steppe, and certainly the Agathyrsi in the Pontic Steppe, as well as the Cimmerians in the Caspian Steppe. The archaeological and historical records regarding these migrations are however scarce, and permit to sketch only a very broad outline of this complex development.

The Sigynnae corresponded to a part of the Chernogorovka-Novocherkassk complex, to whose development three main cultural influences contributed to:

- present in the development of the Chernogorovka-Novocherkassk complex is a strong impact of the native Bilozerka culture, especially in the form of pottery styles and burial traditions;
- the two other influences were of foreign origin:
  - attesting of the Inner Asian origin, a strong material influence from the Altai, Aržan and Karasuk cultures from Central Asia and Siberia is visible in the Chernogorovka-Novocherkassk complex of Inner Asian origin were especially dagger and arrowhead types, horse gear such as bits with stirrup-shaped terminals, deer stone-like carved stelae and Animal Style art;
  - in addition to this Central Asian influence, the Kuban culture of Ciscaucasia also played an important contribution in the development of the Chernogorovka-Novocherkassk complex, especially regarding the adoption of Kuban culture-types of mace heads and bimetallic daggers.

The Chernogorovka-Novocherkassk complex thus developed natively in the North Pontic region over the course of the 9th to mid-7th centuries BC from elements which had earlier arrived from Central Asia, due to which it itself exhibited similarities with the other early nomadic cultures of the Eurasian steppe and forest steppe which existed before the 7th century BC, such as the Aržan culture, so that these various pre-Scythian early nomadic cultures were thus part of a unified Aržan-Chernogorovka cultural layer originating from Central Asia.

Thanks to their development of highly mobile mounted nomadic pastoralism and the creation of effective weapons suited to equestrian warfare, all based on equestrianism, these nomads from the Pontic-Caspian Steppes were able to gradually infiltrate into Central and Southeast Europe and therefore expand deep into this region over a very long period of time, so that the Chernogorovka-Novocherkassk complex covered a wide territory ranging from Central Europe and the Pannonian Plain in the west to Caucasia in the east, including present-day Southern Russia. The Sigynnae, who were part of this grouping of first wave nomads belonging to the Chernogorovka-Novocherkassk complex, eventually moved into the Pannonian Steppe and settled there without losing their links to the rest of the western steppe.

This in turn allowed the Chernogorovka-Novocherkassk complex itself to strongly influence the Hallstatt culture of Central Europe: among these influences was the adoption of trousers, which were not used by the native populations of Central Europe before the arrival of the Central Asian steppe nomads.

=== Initial migration ===
As part of these migrations, the Sigynnae, who appear to have initially lived in, either Ciscaucasia or Transcaucasia, or in the parts of the northern Iranian plateau immediately to the south of the Caspian Sea, moved to the northwest and then travelled to the west through Caucasia and then the Pontic Steppe, although it is still unknown whether the Sigynnae migration route went from Ciscaucasia through Moldavia and then Wallachia, or through the forest steppes and across the northern Carpathian Mountains, to reach the Pannonian Steppe. In the modern period, the Circassian people would employ this same general direction to migrate into Europe.

=== In the Pannonian Steppe ===
During the 9th to 8th centuries BC, the Sigynnae finally settled in the Pannonian Steppe, from where they maintained their links with the Pontic Steppe and became important participants in trade networks through which horse equipment and bimetallic daggers typical of the Eurasian Steppe arrived in the Pannonian Steppe, while to their west across the Istros were the sedentary peoples of the Hallstatt culture, with a demarcation existing between the western parts of the Pannonian Basin inhabited by the sedentary Hallstatt farmers and the eastern part being populated by the nomadic Sigynnae.

The presence of the Sigynnae in the Pannonian Steppe led to very important ethnic and cultural transformations as they themselves eventually underwent denomadisation and mingled with the native population while still maintaining connections with the Pontic Steppe.

These trade routes in which participated the Sigynnae provided the upper classes of the Hallstatt culture with steppe horses and harnesses and high-status equipment such as daggers, resulting in the high-quality steppe horses and elite horse gear being adopted by the Hallstatt culture, thus introducing horse breeds and styles of horse-riding from the steppe into Western Europe.

This role of the Sigynnae in linking the steppe and Hallstatt cultures is visible in a burial from Pécs-Jakab-hegy, where a member of the Hallstatt ruling class was buried in the traditional Hallstatt tradition, but with a weapon set from Caucasia: the deceased was cremated and their ashes were buried together with a dagger, an iron spearhead and an axe imported from Caucasia, as well as locally made steppe-type horse gear, and an iron knife, a whetstone and pottery of the local Hallstatt tribe. This burial thus belonged to a member of the native Hallstatt aristocracy who showed his status within his society by adopting the style of the steppe warriors and riding a steppe breed of horse harnessed like those of the steppe nomads.

==== Cultural influences of the Sigynnae ====
===== Westwards spread of equestrianism =====
Shortly after the first appearance of the Sigynnae in the Pannonian Steppe and the introduction by them of long-legged horses in this region, and beginning around c. 800 BC, the populations of the Hallstatt culture started including bits and side pieces of bronze-made horse bridles in their cremation graves, attesting of an increase in importance of equestrianism in the Hallstatt culture. These changes were the result of extensive exchanges between the Sigynnae and the Hallstatt natives of Transistria, and which must have included the trade of horses.

Due to the steppe horse's better appearance and performance compared to the native horses, it quickly became a symbol of aristocratic status among the communities of the Hallstatt culture, and during the 8th to 7th centuries equestrianism was quickly adopted widely among this culture until as far as Britannia. Some new types of slashing swords might also have been developed during this period as a cavalry weapon.

===== New burial rites =====
Over the course of the 8th to 7th centuries BC, the cultural influences of the steppe nomads of which the Sigynnae were part of led to significant changes in the burial rites of the peoples of the Hallstatt culture, whose aristocrats borrowed and adapted cultural norms from the equestrian steppe peoples.

Among these changes was a new burial rite, widely adopted from Bohemia in the east to the upper Istros and the Rhenane valley region in the west, and whose characteristics were similar to those followed the steppe nomads since the 9th century BC. According to this new rite, the aristocrats of the Hallstatt culture started being inhumated rather than cremated, with the body of the deceased being placed on a funerary cart in a wooden chamber inside a pit, within which were also the trappings of the horses pulling the carts and one riding horse. The tomb itself was covered by a large mound, at the top of which was sometimes placed a stone statue of the deceased.

=== Scythian influence on the Sigynnae ===
In the 6th century BC, some splinter Scythian groups followed the earlier route of the nomads of the Chernogorovka-Novocherkassk wave, passed through the passes of the Carpathian Mountains, and settled in the Pannonian Basin, where some of them settled in the territory of the Agathyrsi while others moved into the Pannonian Steppe and settled in the territory of the Sigynnae, and subsequently intermarried with the local populations while remaining in contact with the Pontic Steppe through trade.

Among these splinter Scythian groups were a section of the Scythian tribe of the Sindi, who had left the region of the Maeotian Sea and migrated westwards into the Pannonian Steppe, unlike the bulk of the Sindi who remained in Ciscaucasia.

These migrations from around c. 600 BC and trade connections placed the nomads of the Pannonian Basin under Scythian influence and contributed to the transformation of the cultures of the Agathyrsi and the Sigynnae into a more Scythian-like form, causing to the Mezocsat culture of the Sigynnae to evolve into the Vekerzug culture.

==== Later influences of the Sigynnae ====
===== On the Hallstatt culture =====
From these more Scythianised Sigynnae, the eastern groups of the Hallstatt culture might have borrowed the Scythian-type arrowheads which around c. 600 BC destroyed several of the eastern Alpine hilltop settlements ranging from South Styria through Burgenland and Lower Austria to South Moravia that protected the core Hallstatt territory. Among the southeast Hallstatt groups of Slovenia, only the aristocrats had access to the use of nomadic equestrian equipment.

Although the direct steppe influences reached only the frontier regions of the Hallstatt culture, they resulted in the adoption of new forms of weapons and equestrian technology in the core territories of these cultures.

These Hallstatt populations appear to have not borrowed the use of the nomads' reflex bows, likely due to the complication of their fabrication, or their animal-shaped pole tops used for the shamanic cults of the steppe.

===== In Illyria =====
The Sigynnae also influenced the populations living in the territories corresponding to modern-day Bosnia and Serbia around c. 500 BC, where the aristocrats had access to innovations coming from the steppe. One example of such steppe influences is the "princely burial" of Atenica, which contained lavish grave goods, including Greek imports and objects made of precious metals.

=== Celtic immigration ===
In the middle of the 5th century BC, the Hallstatt developed into the La Tène culture, whose people are identified with the Celts, who by the late 5th century BC were moving to the east along the upper Istros and initially settled in Transistria before moving into the Pannonian Steppe where lived the Sigynnae and later into the mountainous regions where lived the Agathyrsi. The relations between the Celtic incomers and the Iranic nomads appear to have remained peaceful, with the Celts later intermarrying with the local populations of the Pannonian Basin, thus exposing the Celts to the influence of the beliefs, practices and art styles of the steppe nomads so that motifs borrowed from and influenced by the steppe nomads started appearing in La Tène Celtic art.

Among these borrowed artistic influences were images of predatory carnivores, sometimes attacking herbivorous beasts, as well as motifs of pairs of animals facing each other, giving rise to Celtic motif of the "dragon pairs" which decorated the tops of Celtic sword scabbards. Another motif borrowed by Celtic art from steppe art are pairs of predatory birds around circular shield bosses, reflecting not only the mere artistic influence of the steppe nomads, but also of the borrowing by the Celts of Iranic steppe nomad belief systems expressed through the image of predatory beasts.

=== Legacy ===
==== Antiquity ====
The peoples of the Chernogorovka-Novocherkassk complex of which the Sigynnae were part of introduced the use of trousers into Central Europe, whose local native populations did not wear trousers before the arrival of the first wave of steppe nomads of Central Asian origin into Europe.

The Greek historian Herodotus of Halicarnassus claimed that the Sigynnae described themselves as colonists from Media.

==== In the Middle Ages ====
Although the Sigynnae themselves had disappeared by the Middle Ages, the complex relations between their nomadic groupings and the settled populations of Southeast and Central Europe were continued by the Hungarians, the Bulgars, Rus' and Poles.

==== In the Modern Era ====
In the 19th and 20th centuries CE, some scholars attempted to connect the Sigynnae with the Romani people due to an alleged similarity of the ancient Greek name Sigunnai with the Hungarian name for the Romani, cigány. This hypothesis has since become obsolete and is no longer accepted as having any validity.

According to one hypothesis, the Sigynnae were a people who had been pushed towards the Pannonian Steppe by the migration of the Scythians into the Pontic Steppe over the course of the 8th to 7th centuries BC. However, there is currently no evidence to support this hypothesis, and the early date of the arrival of the Sigynnae in the Pannonian Steppe on the contrary suggests that their migration was part of the initial spread of the Chernogorovka-Novocherkassk complex, and thus preceded the arrival of the Scythians.

== Culture and society ==
=== Location ===
The Sigynnae lived in a place called by the ancient Greeks as the "plain of Laurion," which was likely the eastern part of the Pannonian basin to the north and east of the middle Danube river corresponding to the parts of modern-day Hungary, leading the Greek historian Herodotus of Halicarnassus to call them the "only tribe living to the north of Thrace."

The core territory of the Sigynnae was in the Pannonian Steppe to the east of the Danube, around the valley of the Tisza and extending to the northern hillier regions of what are presently northern Hungary and south-west Slovakia. To the west, the territory of the Sigynnae reached the environs of the Adriatic Sea.

The Graeco-Roman author Strabo recorded the presence of another branch of the Sigynnae living in the parts of Caucasia located in the northern Iranian plateau immediately to the south of the Caspian Sea, where they lived along the Derbices, Hyrcanians and Tapyri.

The Orpheōs Argonautika meanwhile located the Sigynnae between Phasis and Sinope in northern Anatolia, and Stephanus of Byzantium placed them on the southeast of the Black Sea.

==== Neighbours ====
After the 6th century BC, the neighbours of the Sigynnae in the Pannonian Steppe included a western group of the Scythian splinter tribe of the Sindi and the otherwise unknown Grauci.

=== Ethnicity ===
Although the Sigynnae formed the westernmost expansion of steppe culture and were originally part of the Chernogorovka-Novocherkassk complex of Central Asian origin to which belonged many Iranic peoples like the Cimmerians and the Agathyrsi, there is no data available to identify the ethnic and linguistic affiliations of the Sigynnae. It is therefore not known for certain whether the Sigynnae were an Iranic or pre-Iranic people.

=== Social organisation ===
Unlike the nomads of the Pontic Steppe, the Pannonian Basin nomads such as the Sigynnae appear to not have possessed an elite class.

=== Trade ===
The Sigynnae maintained trade links with the Pontic Steppe, from where they bought pottery manufactured in the region of the Tyras and Hypanis rivers and in the coast of Thrace immediately to the south of the Istros river. It was likely from these same regions that the Sigynnae bought steppe horses for breeding, in exchange of which they sold various goods to the populations of the Pontic Steppe.

The Sigynnae in turn sold steppe horses to the western populations of the Hallstatt culture in exchange of several commodities, such as grain.

=== Lifestyle ===
The Sigynnae were mobile pastoral nomads who depended on their sheep and cattle and who cultivated grain on a smaller scale.

The Greek historian Herodotus of Halicarnassus described the Sigynnae as having all the exact same customs as the ancient Persians.

==== Gender roles ====
According to the Graeco-Roman author Strabo of Amasia, the most accomplished women charioteers of the Sigynnae had the right to freely choose their life partners.

==== Horse-rearing ====
The Sigynnae used short-nosed shaggy ponies which were too small to be ridden, but were instead yoked together in four-horse teams, and were able to swiftly pull carts.

The Sigynnae employed carts pulled by these horses as their main mode of travel.

==== Religion ====
Animal-shaped pole attachments used as cult devices by shamans were used by the Sigynnae.

==== Warfare ====
The Sigynnae used reflex bows and Scythian-type arrowheads, and appear to have decorated their shields with animal-shaped fittings similarly to the nomads of the Pontic Steppe.

==== Clothing and grooming ====
===== Dress =====
The Sigynnae dressed themselves in the "Median fashion," that is consisting of sleeved tunics as well as trousers. Because of this, they did not make use of the fibulae and pins which the native populations of the Danube region then needed to wear their own traditional clothing.

===== Tattooing =====
The use of pintaders, that is clay stamps used to mark tattooed pictures on a person's skin, by the population of the Vekerzug culture corresponding to the Sigynnae implies that they tattooed themselves.

==== Funerary customs ====
Unlike the previous Bronze Age cultures of the Pannonian Steppe who cremated their dead, the Sigynnae buried their deceased, who were laid in small cemeteries in a west–east orientation along with a large pot and a cup or bowls and joints of mutton of beef. Unlike the nomads of the rest of the Eurasian Steppe, however, the Sigynnae had stopped including weapons among the grave goods of their deceased by the time they had arrived in the Pannonian Steppe.

== Archaeology ==
=== Chernogorovka-Novocherkassk origin ===
The Sigynnae appear to have originally belonged to the Chernogorovka-Novocherkassk complex in the 8th century BCE, when they first occupied the Pannonian Steppe, and their arrival itself represented a cultural discontinuity with the previous material cultures of this region such as the local groups of the Urnfield culture.

=== Mezőcsát phase ===
This section of the Chernogorovka-Novocherkassk complex of the Pannonian Steppe contributed to the formation of the Mezőcsát culture.

=== Vekerzug phase ===
From around c. 600 BC, the Mezőcsát culture came under the influence of the Scythian culture, and consequently evolved into the Scythian-influenced Vekerzug culture, with this transition corresponding to a wave of destruction of Mezőcsát settlements around this period.

The Sigynnae correspond to the Mezőcsát culture and the southern group of the Vekerzug culture, which is also called the Szentes-Vekerzug group.

The Vekerzug culture to which corresponded the Sigynnae was located in the steppe land of Hungary to the east of the Danube, centred around the valley of the Tisza River and extending northwards till the hillier regions of northern Hungary and south-west Slovakia. This culture is named after a burial site of this culture from found at Szentes-Vekerzug.

The Vekerzug culture's Scythian-type objects and burial practices eventually spread towards the west into the Little Hungarian Plain and south-west Slovakia, with this section being called the Chotin group of the Vekerzug culture.

Objects found isolated or in graves in territories identifiable with the Sigynnae are characteristic of the Scythian culture, and consist of:

- military gear such as:
  - arrows,
  - quivers,
  - akīnakai,
  - iron battle-axes,
  - scale armour,
  - shields;
- horse gear,
- personal accessories such as:
  - bronze mirrors,
  - pole-top rattles,
  - bronze kettles,
  - gold ornaments,
  - and dress attachments.

The Vekerzug culture finally came to an end with the expansion of the Celtic La Tène culture into the Pannonian Basin in the 4th century BCE.

==== Burial sites ====
The archaeological remains of the Vekerzug culture consist of cemetery sites with diverse types of locally manufactured objects as well as Scythian-type weapons and horse equipment. Unlike the other steppe nomads, the people of the Vekerzug culture did not bury their dead in barrow graves, but instead used shallow cemeteries where the deceased were buried in shallow and sparsely equipped pits.

One of the most elaborate burials from the Vekerzug culture is from Ártánd in the Hajdú-Bihar region of Hungary: its grave goods included an iron battle-axe, a spear, a shield, a suit of iron scale armour, as set of iron horse trappings, and several personal ornaments, as well as two bronze vessels, a Greek hydria made in Sparta around c. 570 BC, and an early 6th century BC swing-handled pail common to the Hallstatt culture. The aristocrat of Ártánd appears to have been an exception to the general absence of evidence of elite formation among the steppe nomads of the Pannonian Basin.

The Ártánd burial thus belonged to an aristocrat of a high enough status that he was able to obtain luxury goods from a wide variety of place: the swing-handled pail was obtained from the region of the Alps; the Scythian-type horse gear, battle-axe and spear were likely made within the Pannonian Steppe; the scale armour was imported from the Pontic Scythian kingdom; the Greek hydria may have arrived in Sigynnae territory either directly, or it was originally exported from Sparta to Scythia, and from there to the Sigynnae.

==== Lack of fibulae and pins ====
Unlike the native populations of the Danube whose clothing required fibulae and pins to be worn, the remains of the Mezőcsát and of the southern group of the Vekerzug culture from the 6th to 5th centuries BCE contained none of these, implying that the Sigynnae wore trousers and sleeved tunics.

==== Pintaders ====
Remains of the Vekerzug culture also contained pintaderas, which were clay stamps used to mark tattooed images on people's skin, and which originated from Caucasia, where they were used both in Transcaucasia and in the Kuban culture of Ciscaucasia. These, along with items of West Asian origin found throughout sites of the Vekerzug culture, attest of significant West Asian influences on the material culture of the Sigynnae.

==== Horse sacrifice ====
Horse sacrifices, which were a typical aspect of the culture of the Pontic Steppe's nomads, were present in Vekerzug burials, although it occurred in small numbers among the Sigynnae, so that there was rarely more than one horse being present per burial. This includes the sixteen small tarpan horses whose skeletons were found in the many barrow graves at Szentes-Vekerzug corresponding to the small horse breed that Herodotus of Halicarnassus described as being used by the Sigynnae.

== Genetics ==
=== Haplogroups ===
The Sigynnae had haplogroups R1a and G2a.

=== Autosomal DNA ===
The Sigynnae had almost equal proportions of Neolithic and steppe origins associated with the Yamnaya culture. And some had a minor WHG contribution.

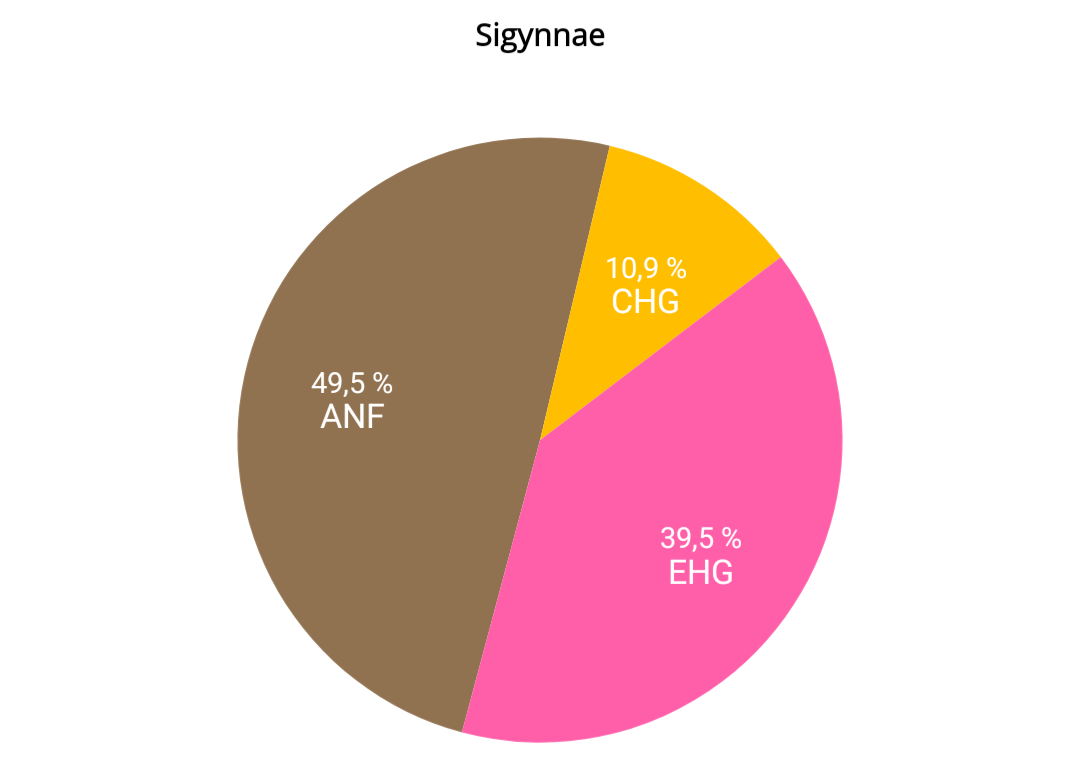
Autosomal DNA Sigynnae

== See also ==
- Iazyges
- Scythian cultures

== Sources ==
- Batty, Roger (2007). Rome and the Nomads: The Pontic-Danubian Realm in Antiquity. Oxford: Oxford University Press. ISBN 978-0-198-14936-1.
- Cunliffe, Barry (2019). The Scythians: Nomad Warriors of the Steppe. Oxford: Oxford University Press. ISBN 978-0-198-82012-3.
- Jacobson, Esther (1995). The Art of the Scythians: The Interpenetration of Cultures at the Edge of the Hellenic World. Leiden, Netherlands: Brill Publishers. ISBN 978-9-004-09856-5.
- Mayor, Adrienne (2014). The Amazons: Lives and Legends of Warrior Women across the Ancient World. Princeton, United States: Princeton University Press. pp. 143–144. ISBN 978-0-691-14720-8.
- Melyukova, Anna I. (1995). "2. Scythians of Southeastern Europe". In Davis-Kimball, Jeannine; Bashilov, Vladimir A.; Yablonsky, Leonid T. [in Russian] (eds.). Nomads of the Eurasian Steppes in the Early Iron Age. Berkeley, United States: Zinat Press. pp. 27–61. ISBN 978-1-885979-00-1.
- Olbrycht, Marek Jan [in Polish] (2000a). "The Cimmerian Problem Re-Examined: the Evidence of the Classical Sources". In Pstrusińska, Jadwiga [in Polish]; Fear, Andrew (eds.). Collectanea Celto-Asiatica Cracoviensia. Kraków: Księgarnia Akademicka. pp. 71–100. ISBN 978-8-371-88337-8.
- Olbrycht, Marek Jan [in Polish] (2000b). "Remarks on the Presence of Iranian Peoples in Europe and Their Asiatic Relations". In Pstrusińska, Jadwiga [in Polish]; Fear, Andrew (eds.). Collectanea Celto-Asiatica Cracoviensia. Kraków: Księgarnia Akademicka. pp. 101–140. ISBN 978-8-371-88337-8.
- Parzinger, Hermann (2004). Die Skythen [The Scythians] (in German). Munich, Germany: Verlag C.H.Beck. ISBN 978-3-406-50842-4.
- Petrenko, Vladimir G. (1995). "1. Scythian Culture in the North Caucasus". In Davis-Kimball, Jeannine; Bashilov, Vladimir A.; Yablonsky, Leonid T. [in Russian] (eds.). Nomads of the Eurasian Steppes in the Early Iron Age. Berkeley, United States: Zinat Press. pp. 5–25. ISBN 978-1-885979-00-1.
- Sulimirski, Tadeusz; Taylor, T. F. (1991). "The Scythians". In Boardman, John; Edwards, I. E. S.; Hammond, N. G. L.; Sollberger, E.; Walker, C. B. F. (eds.). The Assyrian and Babylonian Empires and other States of the Near East, from the Eighth to the Sixth Centuries B.C. The Cambridge Ancient History. Vol. 3. Cambridge, United Kingdom: Cambridge University Press. pp. 547–590. ISBN 978-1-139-05429-4.
- Tokhtas’ev, Sergei R. [in Russian] (1991). "Cimmerians". Encyclopædia Iranica. New York City, United States: Encyclopædia Iranica Foundation; Brill Publishers.
