= Proteas of Zeugma =

Ancient Greek grammarian and Homeric scholar

Proteas (Ancient Greek: Πρωτέας) was an ancient grammarian and the author of a commentary on Homer. His dates are uncertain, but as he was seemingly cited by Herodian he could have lived no later than the middle of the 2nd century AD. He was a native of the city of Zeugma in Syria. Stephanus of Byzantium cites him as a famous Zeugmatite.

Proteas's commentary is lost and is known only from three citations. It is quoted in two in scholia, one on the Odyssey and one on the Iliad, although the identification of the source as Proteas in the first case is not completely certain. In addition, the Byzantine Etymologicum Magnum cites Proteas Zeugmatites arguing that the name of the Cimmerians mentioned in the Odyssey is a corruption of "Cheimerians", inhabitants of the city of Cheimerion. The three separate attestations show that the work dealt with orthography, etymology and exegesis.
