= Kuban steppe =

The Kuban steppe is one of the major steppes in Europe, located in southwestern Russia between the city of Rostov on Don and the Caucasus Mountains. The Kuban steppe is the historic home of the Cossacks.
