= Anna Melyukova =

Russian archaeologist

- Born: 14 December 1921
- Died: 7 March 2004 (aged 82)
- Education: MSU Faculty of History
- Known for: Pioneering research in Scythian archaeology
- Scientific career
- Fields: Archaeology
- Institutions: Moscow State University

Anna Ivanovna Melyukova (Russian: Анна Ивановна Мелюкова; 14 December 1921 – 7 March 2004) was a Russian archaeologist and a pioneer in the field of Scythian archaeology. At her alma mater, Moscow State University, she held the position of professor of archaeology and eventually, became the head of its department of Scythology.

== Biography ==
Anna Ivanovna Melyukova was born on 14 December 1921, the daughter of a sculptor and ornamentalist. She received an interest in art through her family.

Melyukova entered the Faculty of History at Moscow State University in 1939, from which she was graduated with distinction in 1945. Her dissertation was on the funerary constructions of Scythian royal mounds. She studied under the distinguished scholar, Boris Grakov. He became her mentor and she worked closely with him. They collaborated in researching and publishing material on the Scythians. She became a professor of archaeology at the university.

In 1950, Melyukova received her Ph.D. from the MSU Faculty of History after defending her thesis on the military equipment of the Scythians. Subsequently, her thesis became a reference work for all researchers on the weapons and military affairs of the peoples of the early Iron Age.

Upon the death of Grakov in 1970, Melyukova succeeded him as head of the department of Scythology at Moscow State University.

Melyukova died on 7 March 2004.

== Selected bibliography ==
- Вооружение, войско и военное искусство скифов, 1950
- Об этнических и культурных различиях в степных и лесостепных областях европейской части СССР в скифское время, 1954
- Скифия и фракийский мир, 1979
- Степи европейской части СССР в скифо-сарматское время, 1989
