= Jeannine Davis-Kimball =

American archaeologist and prehistorian

- Born: November 23, 1929; Driggs, Idaho, U.S.
- Died: April 3, 2017 (aged 87); Ventura, California, U.S.
- Education: Autonomous University of Madrid; California State University, Northridge (BA); University of California, Berkeley (PhD)
- Occupation: Archaeologist

Jeannine Davis-Kimball (November 23, 1929 – April 3, 2017) was an American archaeologist who specialized in gender studies and prehistory.

== Early years and education ==
Jeannine Davis-Kimball was born November 23, 1929, in Driggs, Idaho.

In 1972, she studied at the Autonomous University of Madrid in Spain. She graduated from California State University, Northridge in 1978 with a Bachelor of Arts degree and earned a Ph.D. in 1988 from the University of California, Berkeley.

== Research and career ==
As a result of her work on her doctoral thesis, she moved to Central Asia in 1985 to study nomads. She became known above all for her research of the "Amazon tombs" in Southern Russia. In the 1990s, Davis-Kimball and her Russian archeology colleague, Leonid Jablonski, found in southern Russia and Ukraine numerous tombs (kurgans) of Scythian or Sarmatian women who had been buried along with weapons and armor. An important locality is a necropolis at Pokrovka.

Davis-Kimball explored areas where there are still women participating in active nomadic culture who shoot with bows and ride regularly. She discovered in Western Mongolia, which is inhabited mainly by Kazakhs, the sought-after genetic traits in women. The nomadic women of this area were experienced archers and riders; their equipment and their jewelry resembled the finds discovered by Davis Kimball in the kurgan. This was the reason she was looking for "living proof of the Amazons" in this region. She came across a blonde Kazakh girl named Maryemgül who was already a very good rider at the age of nine. Due to the deviating from the other members of the tribe's phenotype (blond, Central Asian features) of the girl, Davis-Kimball assumed that they have found a descendant of the "Amazon women". The black-haired mother of the girl also said that every now and then, blonde girls were born in their family and in the surrounding area. To prove their assumptions, Davis-Kimball and Joachim Burger had a genetic test done. They were able to prove that the genetics of the Kazakh girl were almost 100 percent consistent with the genetic profile of the "Amazon women" discovered in kurgans. The connection of the fabled Amazons to the Kazakh tribe in western Mongolia is not conclusively proven.

She died April 3, 2017, in Ventura, California.

== Selected works ==
- Proportions in Achaemenid art, 1988
- Finding guide to the California Indian Library Collections : Glenn County, 1993
- Finding guide to the California Indian Library Collections : Humboldt County , 1993
- Finding guide to the California Indian Library Collections : Madera County, 1993
- Finding guide to the California Indian Library Collections : Marin County, 1993
- Finding guide to the California Indian Library Collections : Shasta County, 1993
- Finding guide to the California Indian Library Collections : Tehama County, 1993
- Worker owner privatization manual, 1993
- Organizing and caring for photographic collections using computer techniques : an introductory manual, 1993
- Pomo Indians [interactive multimedia]: compiled by Jeannine and Randal S. Brandt., 1994
- Turkestan today, 1994
- Miwok Indians, 1994
- Kurgans on the left bank of the Ilek : excavatins at Pokrovka 1990-1992, 1995
- Nomads of the Eurasian steppes in the early iron age, 1995
- Kurgans, ritual sites, and settlements : Eurasian Bronze and Iron Age, 2000
- Warrior women : an archaeologist's search for history's hidden heroines, 2003
- Harcos nők Egy régész kutatása a történelem rejtett hősnői után., 2004
- Amazon warrior women, 2004
- Donne guerriere : le sciamane delle vie della seta, 2009
- Nomads of the Altai Mountains : the Mongols : ancient traditions in a modern world, 2010
- The Seymours & the Kimballs : a collected ethnography & genealogy of a plethora of descendants, 2011
- Archéologie : [dossier], 2012
- Amazonlar : tarihin gizli kalmış kadın kahramanlarının peşinde bir arkeolog, 2013

== See also ==
- Amazons
