= Kerch =

City in Crimea

Kerch: Керч (Ukrainian); Керчь (Russian); Keriç / Керич (Crimean Tatar)
- City
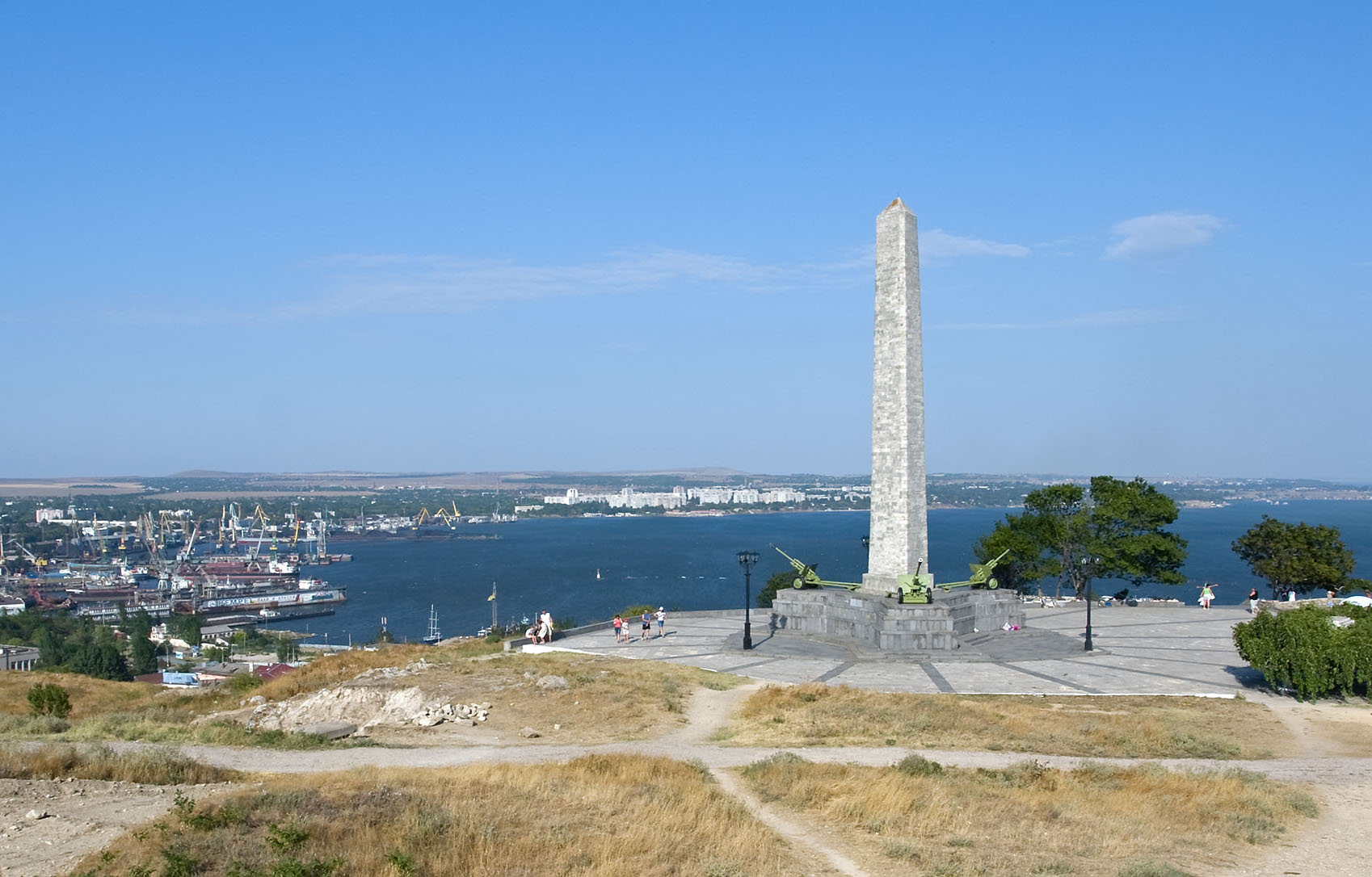
- The Obelisk of Glory on Mount Mithridates

- Flag Coat of arms
- Interactive map of Kerch
- Location of Kerch in Crimea Location of Kerch in Ukraine Location of Kerch in European Russia Location of Kerch in Europe
- Coordinates: 45°21′43″N 36°28′16″E
- Country (de facto): Russia
- Federal Subject (Republic) (de facto): Crimea
- City (de facto): Kerch
- Country (de jure): Ukraine
- Autonomous republic (de jure): Crimea
- Raion (de jure): Kerch

Government
  - Head: Oleg Katorgin

Area
  - Total: 108 km^{2} (42 sq mi)
- Elevation: 10 m (33 ft)

Population (2017)
  - Total: 149,566
  - Density: 1,464.49/km^{2} (3,793.0/sq mi)
- Time zone: UTC+3
- Postal code: 298300 – 298399
- Area code: +7-36561
- Former name(s): Panticapaeum, Bosporus, Vosporo, Korchev, Cerchio
- Sister cities: Mogilev, Smolensk, Çanakkale, Oryol, Odintsovo, Sochi
- Climate: Cfa
- Website: горсовет-керчь.рф (de facto)

Kerch, (Note: Ukrainian: Керч, pronounced [kɛrtʃ]; Russian: Керчь, pronounced [kʲertɕ]; Old East Slavic: Кърчевъ; Ancient Greek: Παντικάπαιον, romanized: Pantikápaion; Medieval Greek: Βόσπορος, romanized: Bósporos; Turkish: Kerç.) also known as Kerich, (Note: Crimean Tatar: Керич, romanized: Keriç.) is a city on the Kerch Peninsula in the east of Crimea. It has a population of 147,033 (2014 Census).

Founded 2,600 years ago as the ancient Greek colony Pantikapaion, Kerch is one of the most ancient cities in Crimea. The city experienced rapid growth starting in the 1920s and was the site of a major battle during World War II.

Today, it is one of the largest cities in Crimea and is among the area's most important industrial, transport and tourist centres. As with the rest of Crimea, it has been occupied by Russian forces since the Russian annexation of Crimea in 2014.

== History ==
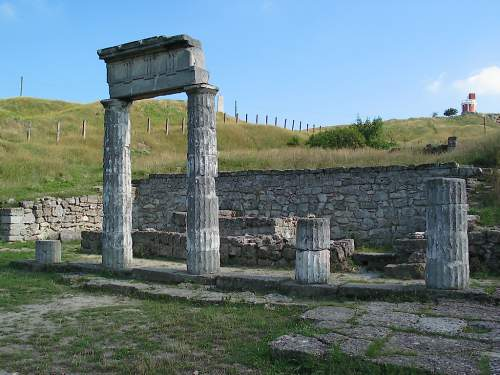
Ruins of Panticapaeum from the 6th century BC

=== Ancient times ===
Archeological digs at Mayak village near the city ascertained that the area had already been inhabited in the 17th–15th centuries BC. While many finds from Kerch can be found in the Hermitage Museum in St Petersburg and the local museum, a large number of antique sculptures, reliefs, bronze and glassware, ceramics and jewellery were excavated in 1855–1856 during the Crimean War by Duncan MacPherson, a surgeon from the British Army, and later donated to the British Museum in London.

Kerch as a city starts its history in the 7th century BC, when Greek colonists from Miletus founded a city-state named Panticapaeum on Mount Mithridat near the mouth of the Melek-Chesme river. Panticapaeum subdued nearby cities and by 480 BC became the capital of the Kingdom of Bosporus. Later, during the rule of Mithradates VI Eupator, Panticapaeum for a short period of time became the capital of the much more powerful and extensive Kingdom of Pontus. The city was located at the intersection of trade routes between the steppe and Europe. This caused it to grow rapidly. The city's main exports were grain and salted fish; wine-making was also common. Panticapaeum minted its own coins. According to extant documents the Melek-Chesme river (small and shallow nowadays) was navigable in Bosporan times, and sea galleys were able to enter the river. Much of the city's population is thought to have been ethnically Scythian, later Sarmatian, as implied by the large Royal Kurgan at Kul-Oba.

In the 1st century AD, Panticapaeum and the Kingdom of Bosphorus suffered from Ostrogoth raids; then the city was devastated by the Huns in AD 375.

The settlement of Myrmekion was founded by Ionians in the eastern part of what is now Kerch, some four kilometers north-east of ancient Panticapaeum, in the first half of the 6th century BC.

=== Middle Ages ===
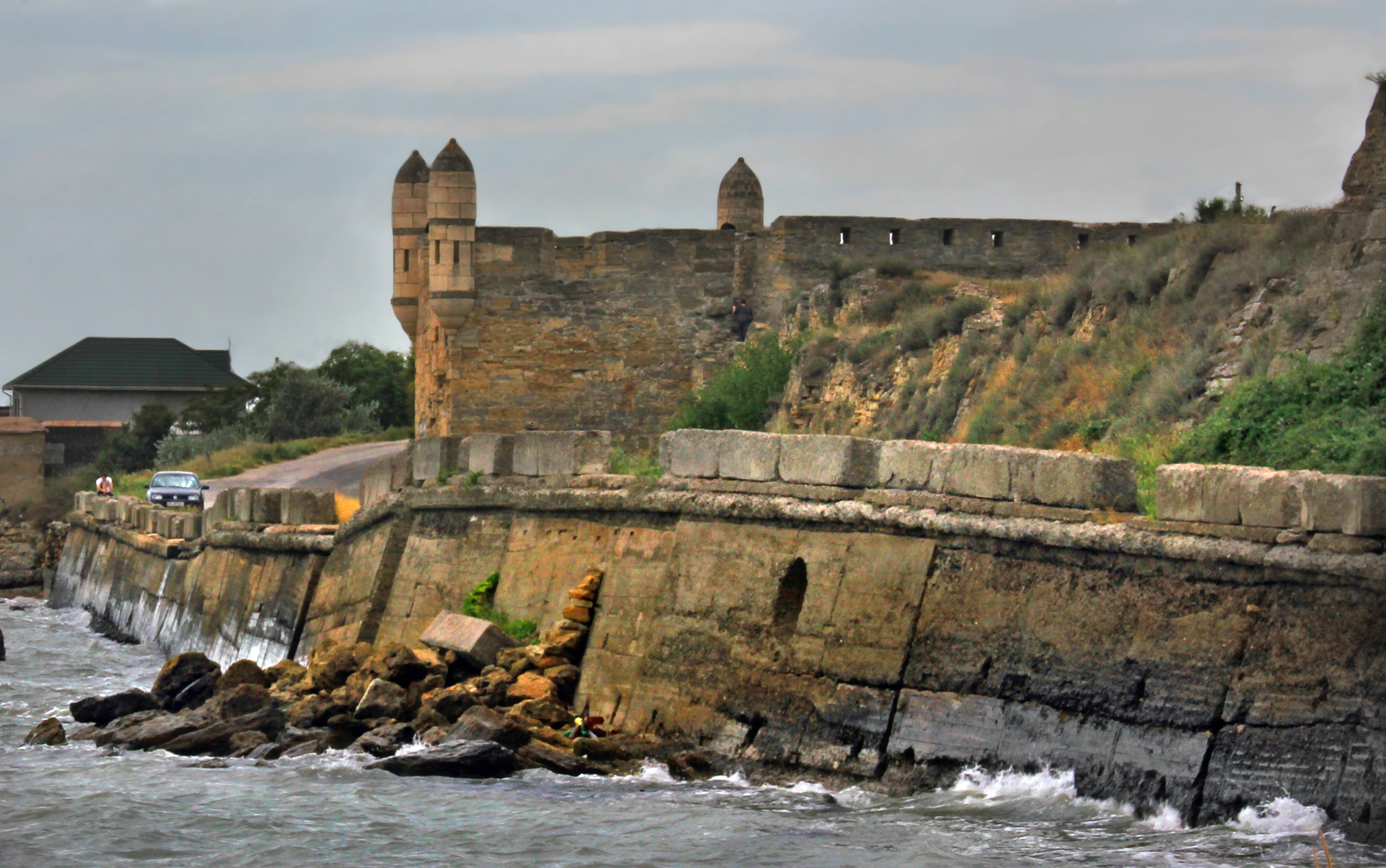
Yenikale fortress

From the 6th century the city was under the control of the Byzantine Empire. By order of Emperor Justinian I, a citadel named Bospor was built there. Bospor was the centre of a bishopric, the diocese of Bosporus and developed under the influence of Greek Christianity. In 576, it withstood a siege by the Göktürks under Bokhan, aided by Anagai, the last khan (ruler) of the Uturgurs (tribe of Huns).

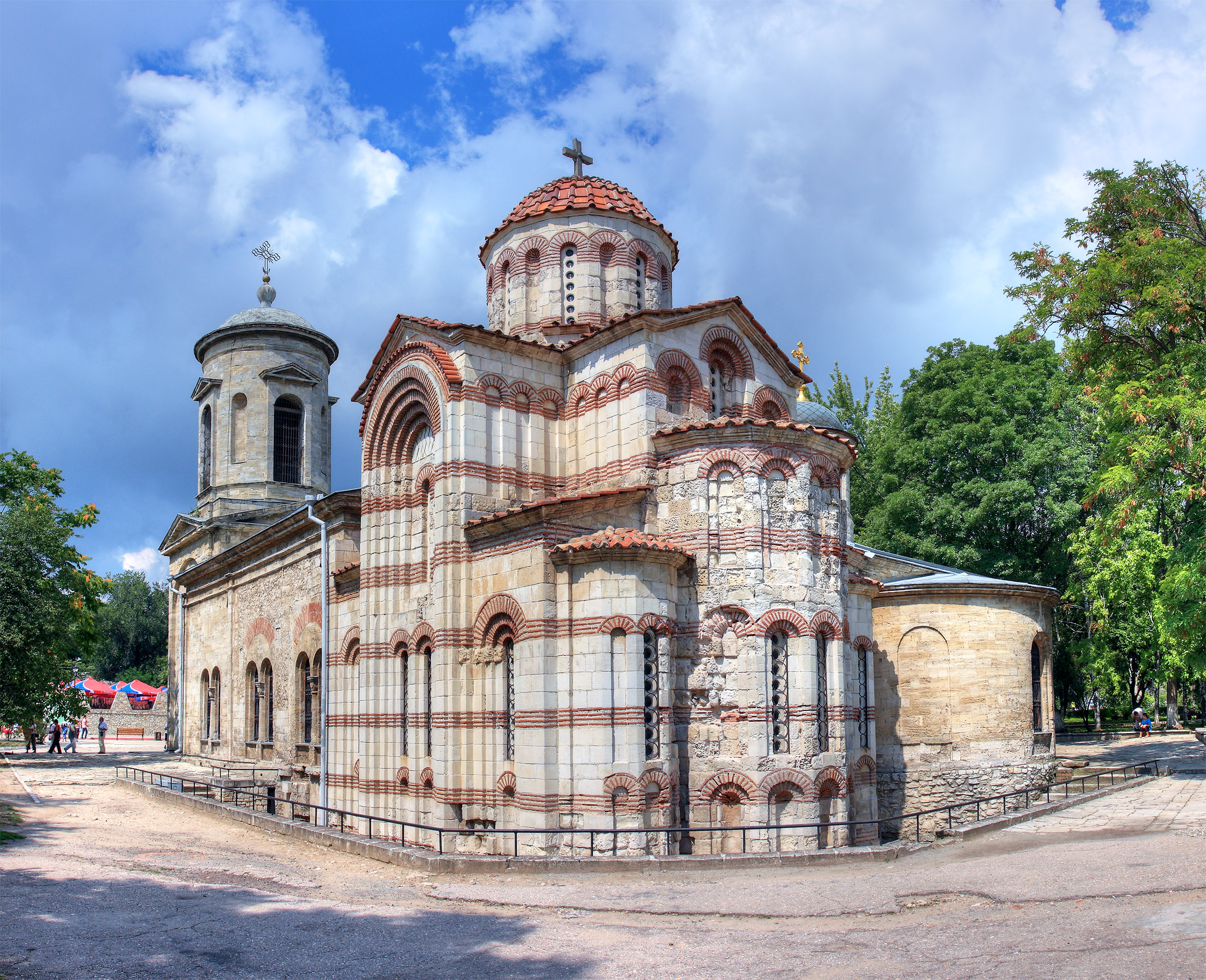
Church of St John the Baptist, built in the 8th century

In the 7th century, the Turkic Khazars took control of Bospor, and the city was named Karcha from Turkic "karşı" meaning 'opposite, facing.' The main local government official during Khazar times was the tudun. During Khazar rule, Kerch was used as a major port for the Khazar slave trade, through which slaves were exported to the Black Sea slave trade.

Christianity was a major religion in Kerch during the period of Khazar rule. Kerch's Church of St. John the Baptist was founded in 717; thus, it is the oldest church in Ukraine. The Church of the Apostles existed during the late 8th and early 9th centuries, according to the Life of the Apostle Andrew by Epiphanius of Salamis.

Following the fall of Khazaria to Kievan Rus' in the late 10th century, Kerch became the centre of a Khazar successor-state. Its ruler, Georgius Tzul, was deposed by a Byzantine-Rus expedition in 1016.

From the 10th century, the city was a Slavic settlement named Korchev, which belonged to the Tmutarakan principality. Kerch was a center of trade between Russia', Crimea, Caucasus and the Orient.

In the 13th century, Crimea including Korchev was invaded by Mongols. After the Mongols, the city became the Genoese colony of Cerco (Cherkio) in 1318 and served as a sea harbour, where townspeople worked at salt works and fishery.

In 1475, the city was passed to the Ottoman Empire. During the Turkish rule Kerch fell into decay and served as a slave-market. It repeatedly suffered from raids of Zaporizhian Cossacks.

=== 18th–20th centuries ===
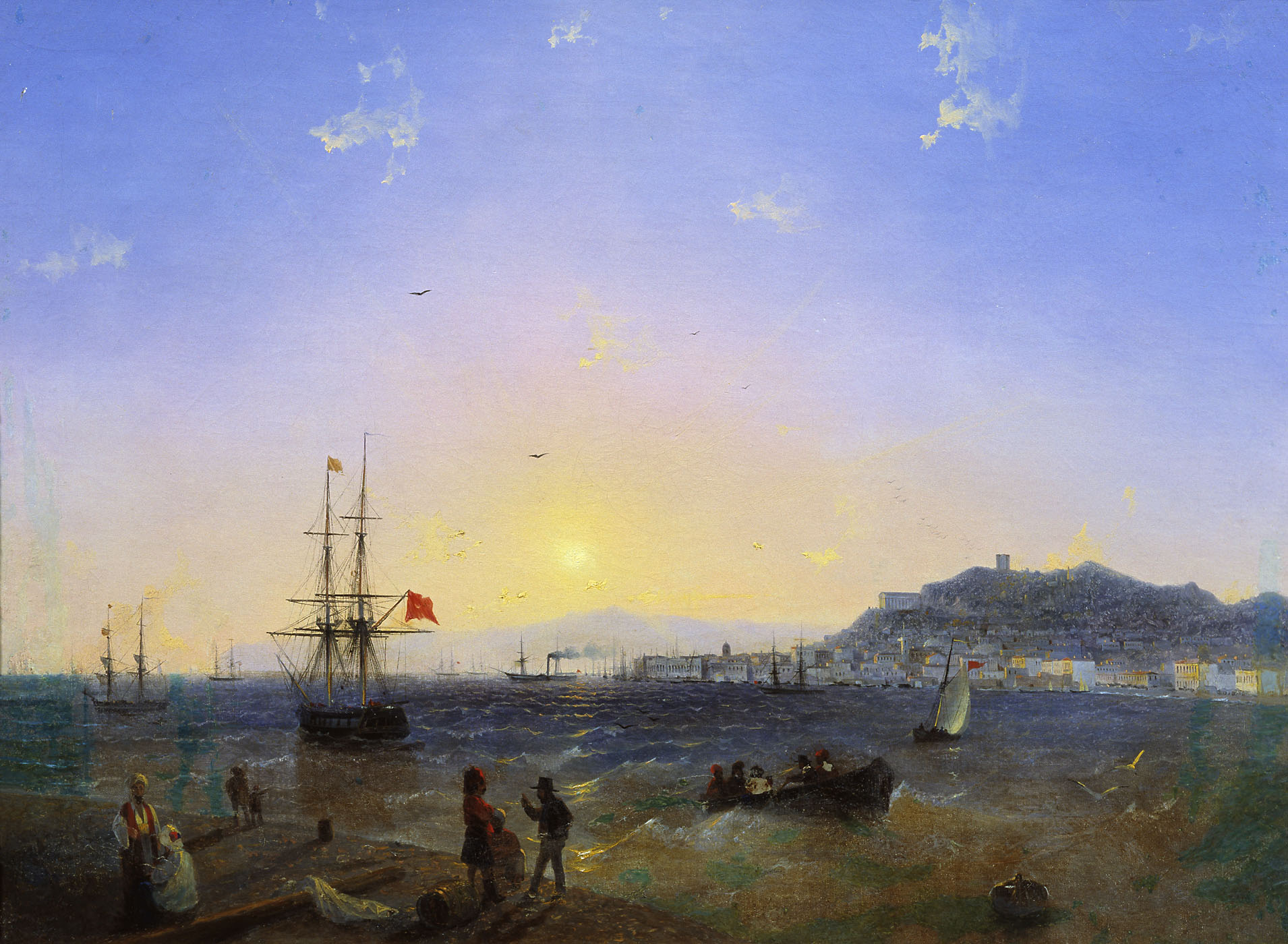
Kerch by Ivan Aivazovsky, 1839

In response to the strengthening of Russian military forces in Azov area, the Turks built a fortress, named Yenikale, near Kerch on the shore of Kerch Strait. The fortress was completed by 1706. In 1771 the Imperial Russian Army invaded Crimea and approached Yenikale. The Turks decided to abandon the fortress, though reinforcements from the Ottoman Empire had arrived a few days earlier. By the Peace Treaty of Kuchuk-Kainarji in 1774, Kerch and Yenikale were ceded to Russia. As a result, the Turkish heritage has been almost completely wiped out.

In 1790 Russian naval forces under the command of admiral Fyodor Ushakov defeated the Turkish fleet at the Battle of Kerch Strait.

Because of its location, from 1821 Kerch developed into an important trade and fishing port. The state museum of ancient times and a number of educational institutions were opened in the city. The ironwork factory was built in 1846 based on a huge iron ore deposit found on Kerch Peninsula.

During the Crimean War the city was devastated by British forces in 1855.

In the late 19th century, mechanical and cement factories were built, and tinned food and tobacco factories were established. By 1900, Kerch was connected to a railroad system, and the fairway of Kerch Strait was deepened and widened. At this time, the population had reached 33,000.

After suffering a decline during the First World War and the Russian Civil War, the city resumed its growth in the late 1920s, with the expansion of various industries, iron ore, and metallurgy in particular, and by 1939 its population had reached 104,500.

=== Kerch in World War II ===
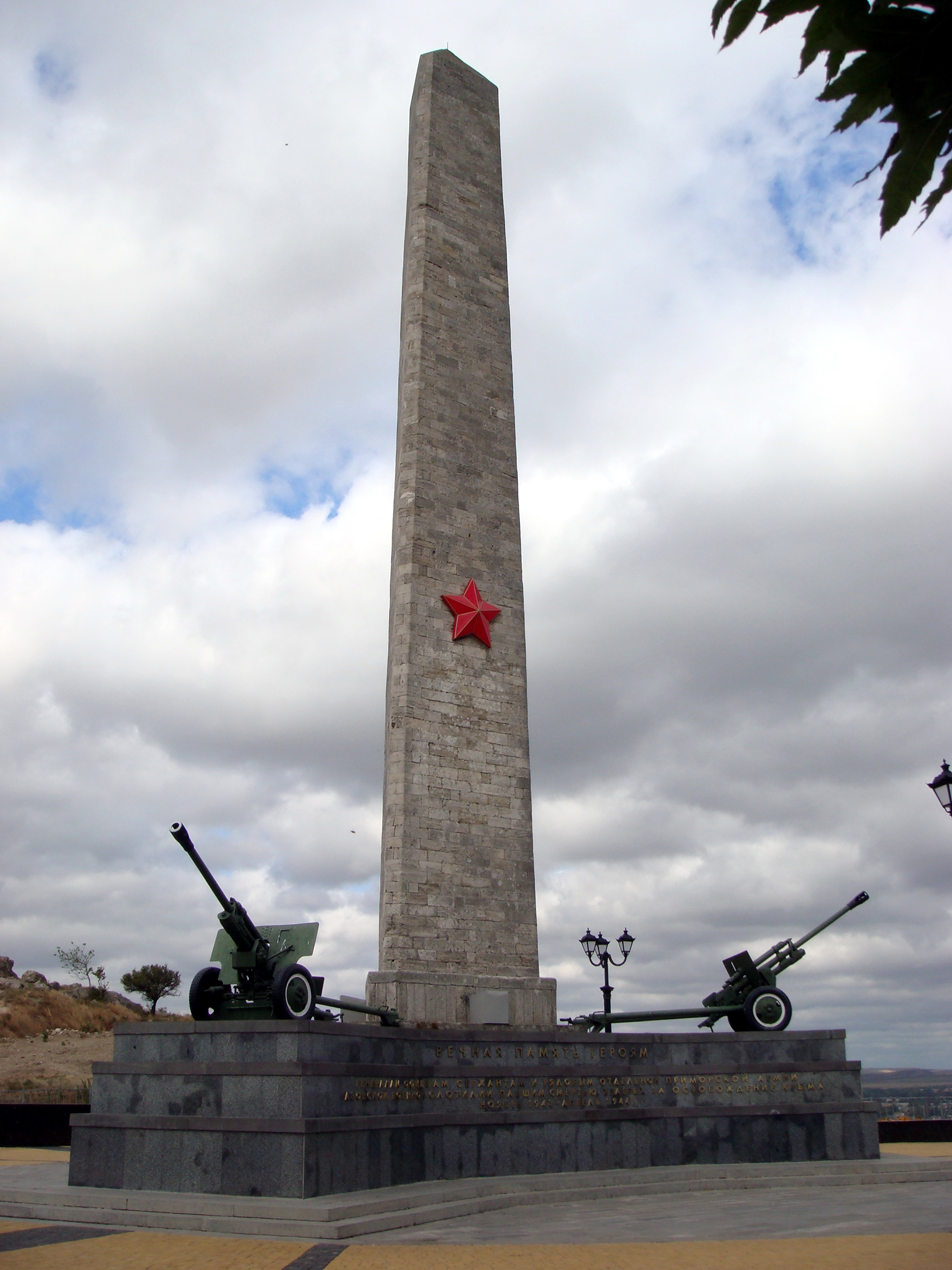
Monument of Glory in Kerch

On the Eastern Front of World War II from 1941 to 1945, Kerch was the site of heavy fighting between Red Army and Axis forces. After fierce fighting, the city was taken by the Germans in November 1941. On 31 December 1941, the 302nd Mountain Rifle Division recaptured the city following a naval landing operation at Kamysh Burun, to the south of the city, five days earlier. In 1942 the Germans occupied the city again. The Red Army lost over 160,000 men, either killed or taken POW at the Battle of the Kerch Peninsula. On 31 October 1943 another Soviet naval landing operation was launched. Kerch returned to Soviet control on 11 April 1944.

The German invaders killed about 15,000 citizens and deported another 14,000 during their occupation. Evidence of German atrocities in Kerch was presented in the Nuremberg trials. After the war, the city was awarded the title Hero City.

The Adzhimushkay catacombs in the city's suburbs were the site of guerrilla warfare against the occupation. Thousands of soldiers and refugees found shelter inside and were involved in counterattacks. Many of them died underground, including those who died of numerous alleged poison gas attacks. Later, a memorial was established on the site.

=== Kerch in Independent Ukraine ===
On 11 November 2007, a powerful storm passed through the city, causing much damage and an ecological disaster as a few ships, including an oil tanker, were shipwrecked and blocked the Kerch Strait.

=== Russian occupation ===
As with other parts of Crimea, Kerch has been occupied by Russian forces since the Russian occupation began in 2014.

On 17 October 2018, an 18-year-old student, Vladislav Roslyakov, killed 20 people and himself at Kerch Polytechnic College.

== Geography ==
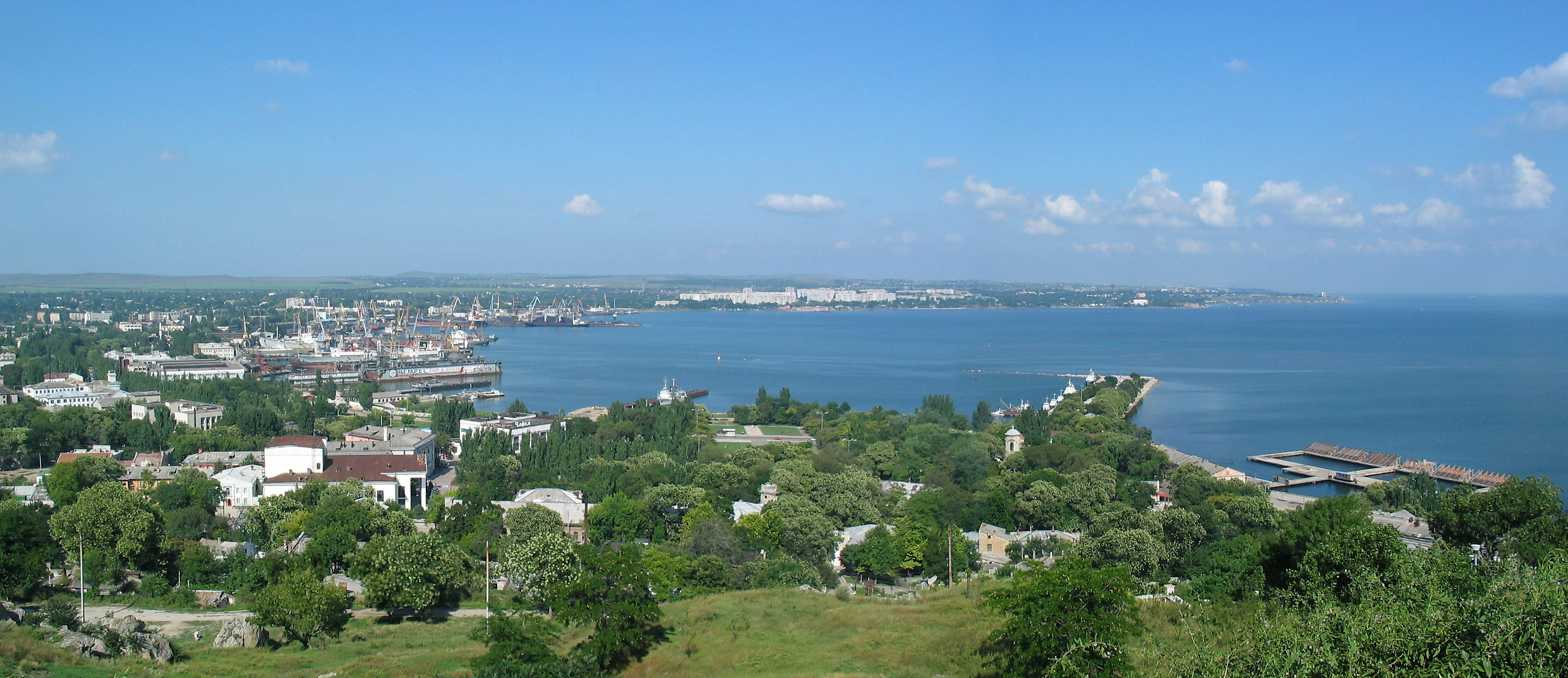
Kerch, view from Mount Mithridat

=== Climate ===
Kerch has a humid subtropical climate (Köppen climate classification Cfa) with cool to cold winters and warm to hot summers.

Climate data for Kerch (1991–2020, extremes 1936–present)
Month	Jan	Feb	Mar	Apr	May	Jun	Jul	Aug	Sep	Oct	Nov	Dec	Year
Record high °C (°F)	17.3 (63.1)	17.8 (64.0)	23.4 (74.1)	27.6 (81.7)	30.6 (87.1)	35.2 (95.4)	37.7 (99.9)	37.9 (100.2)	35.5 (95.9)	30.9 (87.6)	23.2 (73.8)	19.4 (66.9)	37.9 (100.2)
Mean daily maximum °C (°F)	3.8 (38.8)	4.5 (40.1)	8.8 (47.8)	14.9 (58.8)	21.0 (69.8)	26.0 (78.8)	29.0 (84.2)	28.9 (84.0)	23.4 (74.1)	16.9 (62.4)	10.2 (50.4)	5.8 (42.4)	16.1 (61.0)
Daily mean °C (°F)	0.7 (33.3)	1.1 (34.0)	4.7 (40.5)	10.1 (50.2)	16.0 (60.8)	21.2 (70.2)	24.1 (75.4)	24.0 (75.2)	18.6 (65.5)	12.6 (54.7)	6.6 (43.9)	2.8 (37.0)	11.9 (53.4)
Mean daily minimum °C (°F)	−2.0 (28.4)	−1.9 (28.6)	1.2 (34.2)	5.8 (42.4)	11.3 (52.3)	16.3 (61.3)	19.1 (66.4)	19.2 (66.6)	13.9 (57.0)	8.7 (47.7)	3.5 (38.3)	0.1 (32.2)	7.9 (46.2)
Record low °C (°F)	−23.7 (−10.7)	−23.1 (−9.6)	−15.6 (3.9)	−6.5 (20.3)	−1.1 (30.0)	2.8 (37.0)	9.9 (49.8)	7.5 (45.5)	1.0 (33.8)	−5.4 (22.3)	−11.8 (10.8)	−17.6 (0.3)	−23.7 (−10.7)
Average precipitation mm (inches)	38 (1.5)	29 (1.1)	33 (1.3)	29 (1.1)	31 (1.2)	53 (2.1)	33 (1.3)	41 (1.6)	35 (1.4)	31 (1.2)	39 (1.5)	37 (1.5)	429 (16.9)
Average extreme snow depth cm (inches)	1 (0.4)	2 (0.8)	1 (0.4)	0 (0)	0 (0)	0 (0)	0 (0)	0 (0)	0 (0)	0 (0)	0 (0)	1 (0.4)	2 (0.8)
Average rainy days	10	9	11	11	9	10	6	6	8	9	11	11	111
Average snowy days	8	8	5	0.2	0	0	0	0	0	0.1	2	7	30
Average relative humidity (%)	86	83	79	75	74	70	66	65	71	78	83	85	76
Mean monthly sunshine hours	64.5	96.9	142.7	207.2	282.3	307.7	349.0	322.3	246.7	172.5	92.9	59.9	2,344.6
Source 1: Pogoda.ru.net
Source 2: NOAA

== Administration ==
The city municipality stretches over a substantial area and includes several separate neighborhoods that are part of the Kerch city: Eltigen (Heroyevskoe), Kamysh-Burun (Arshyntsevo), Port Krym, Adzhimushkai, and Tuzla Island.

== Demographics ==
Historical population
Year	Pop.	±% p.a.
1897	33,347	—
1923	25,986	−0.95%
1926	34,624	+10.04%
1939	104,443	+8.86%
1959	98,769	−0.28%
1970	127,608	+2.36%
1979	156,827	+2.32%
1989	174,365	+1.07%
1992	180,500	+1.16%
1998	167,400	−1.25%
2001	157,007	−2.11%
2003	155,294	−0.55%
2004	153,916	−0.89%
2005	152,564	−0.88%
2006	151,327	−0.81%
2007	150,088	−0.82%
2008	149,021	−0.71%
2009	148,120	−0.60%
2010	147,269	−0.57%
2011	146,516	−0.51%
2012	145,845	−0.46%
2013	145,265	−0.40%
2014	144,626	−0.44%
2020	151,548	+0.78%
2021	154,621	+2.03%
2024	152,328	−0.50%
2025	151,103	−0.80%

In 2014, the population of Kerch was 144,626.

== Economy ==
Today Kerch is home to many metallurgists, shipbuilders, and fishermen. It also has a significant tourism sector.

=== Industry ===
The largest enterprises in the city are:

- Kerch Metallurgical Works Factory launched in 1900
- Kamysh-Burun Iron Ore Plant
- Zaliv Shipyard that produces and repairs tankers and cargo ships.

Construction-materials, food processing, and light industries play a significant role in the city's economy. Kerch is also a fishing fleet base and an important processing centre for numerous fish products.

- Kerch Aircraft Repair Plant KeARZ
- KMZ KMK Metallurgical Plant, Kerch east
- Oil and Gas extraction industry petrochemical and storage
- Zaliv Shipyard, (Kamysh Burun Zheleznogoroda)
- Kvartz Quartz Glass Factory Plant KSZ (Glass (various) and optics, optical materials and instruments) (Kerch)
- PSZ Albatros, PSZ KMPZ Vityaz Priladobudivni (Instruments and Instruments making, Machinery, Engineering)
- Kamysh Burun Iron Metallurgy Plant
- KMZ KMTP SV Fregat floating docks yard and ship repair yard
- KSRZ uvas-trans floating docks yards and ship repair (also lesser Kerch ship repair yards around)

=== Tourism ===
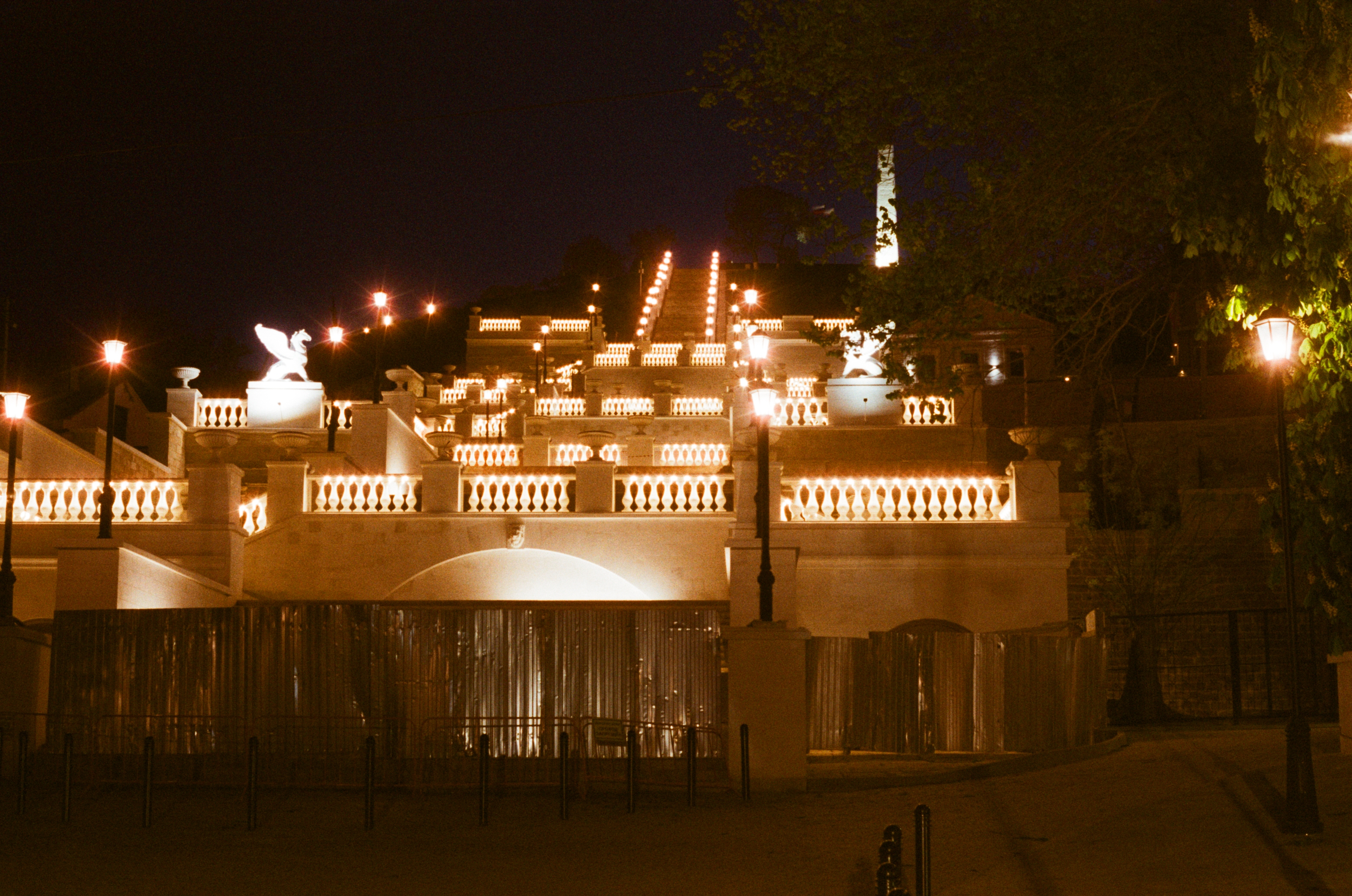
Mithridates Staircase (19th century)

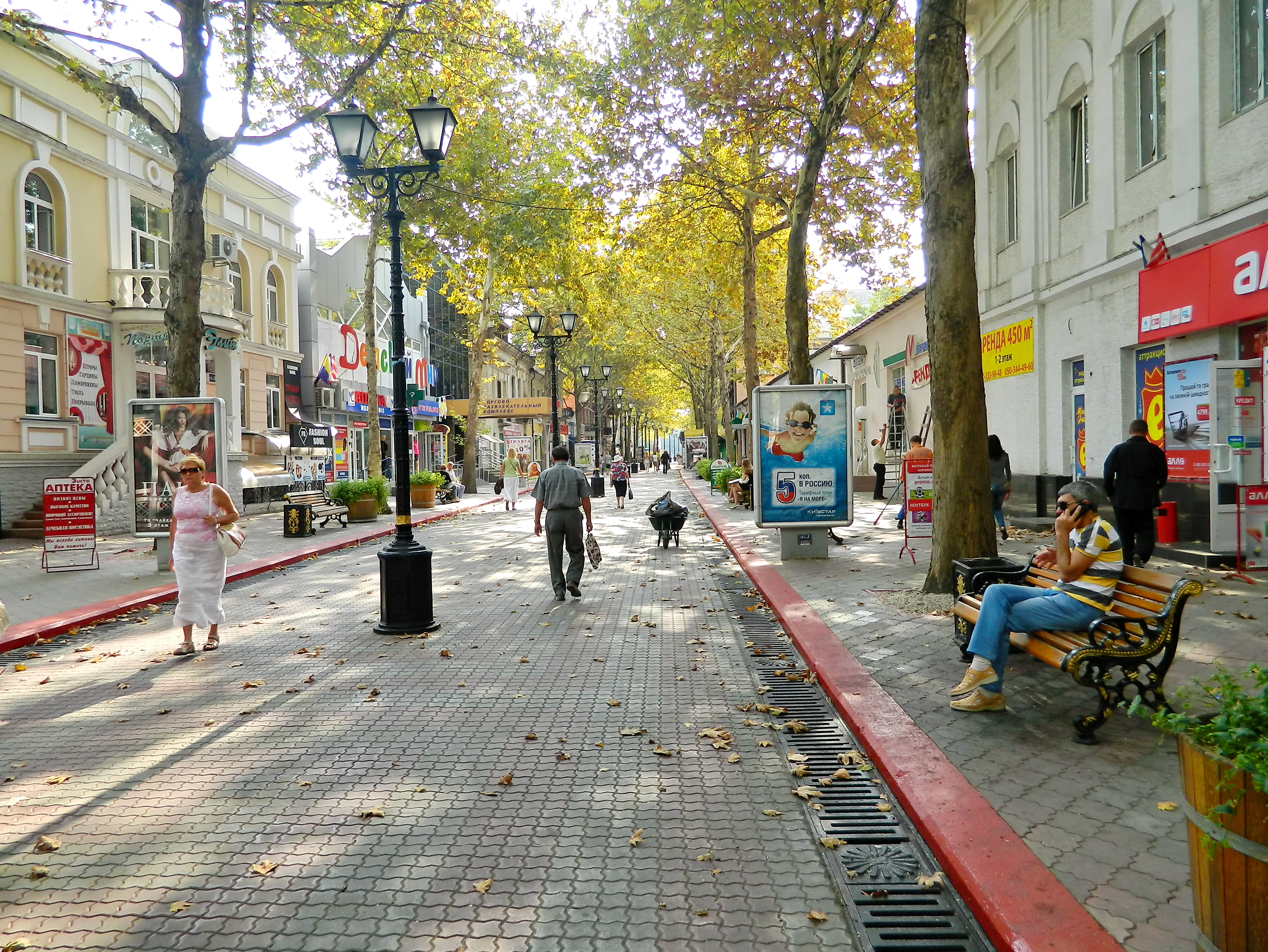
Lenina Street in Kerch

Because of its location on the shores of the Azov and Black seas, Kerch became a popular summer resort among people of the former USSR. Also, several mud-cure sources are located near the city. Despite the seaside location, the tourist appeal of Kerch today is limited because of the industrial character of the city and associated pollution. Despite the lack of beaches in the town's area, there are a lot of them at a distance of 20 minutes' travel by bus, train or taxi.

Kerch has a number of impressive architectural and historical monuments. Ancient historical heritage of the city makes it attractive for scientific tourism. The most notable of Kerch's sights are:

- Site of ancient settlement Pantikapaion (5th century BC–3rd century AD).
- Royal Kurgan (4th century BC) – burial mound for one of the Bosporian kings
- Church of St. John the Baptist (AD 717)
- Fortress of Yenikale (18th century)
- The Great Mithridates Staircase leading on top of the Mount Mithridat, contains 428 footsteps, built in 1833–1840 under the guidance of Italian architect Alexander Digbi
- Obelisk of Glory on the Mount Mithridat, built after World War II
- Lapidarium
- Memorial of heroic guerilla warfare in Adzhimushkay mines
- Kerch Fortress; restricted area in Soviet times but free to enter in present days. The fortress was built by the Russian military architect Totleben in the middle of 19th century.
- Sites of ancient settlements Myrmekion, Tyritake and Nymphaion. There are also some settlements which have gone underwater due to earthquakes.
- Demeter's Crypt, a crypt with numerous frescos dated 1st century BC.

=== Transport ===
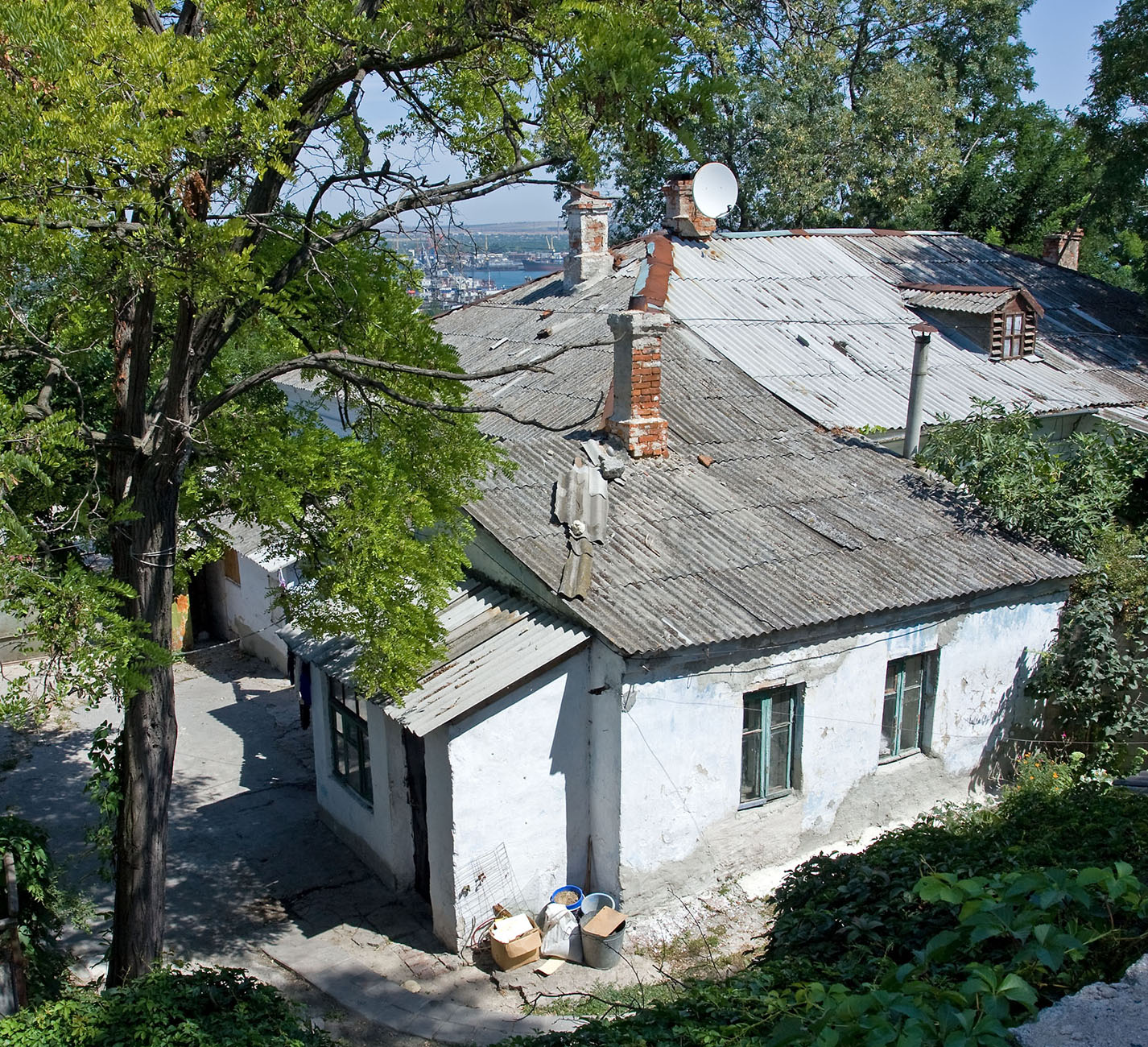
Private houses are common in Kerch.

Kerch has a harbour on the Kerch Strait, which makes it a key to the Sea of Azov. It has several railroad terminals and a small airport. The Kerch Strait ferry line across the Kerch Strait was established in 1953, connecting Crimea and the Krasnodar Krai (Port Krym – Port Kavkaz line); (as of November 2009) there are also plans for a Kerch-Poti ferry route. Tavrida Highway work in progress along Kerch railway (two rails) highway (four lanes) bridge to connect Rostov Krasnodar with peninsula.

There are several ports in Kerch, including Kerch Maritime Trading Port, Kerch Maritime Fishing Port, Port Krym (ferry crossing), Kamysh-Burun Port.

The railroad terminals include: Kerch, Kerch I, Kerch Factory, Arshyntsevo, and Krym.

A bus network connects Kerch to other cities in Crimea and Krasnodar Krai.

==== City transport ====
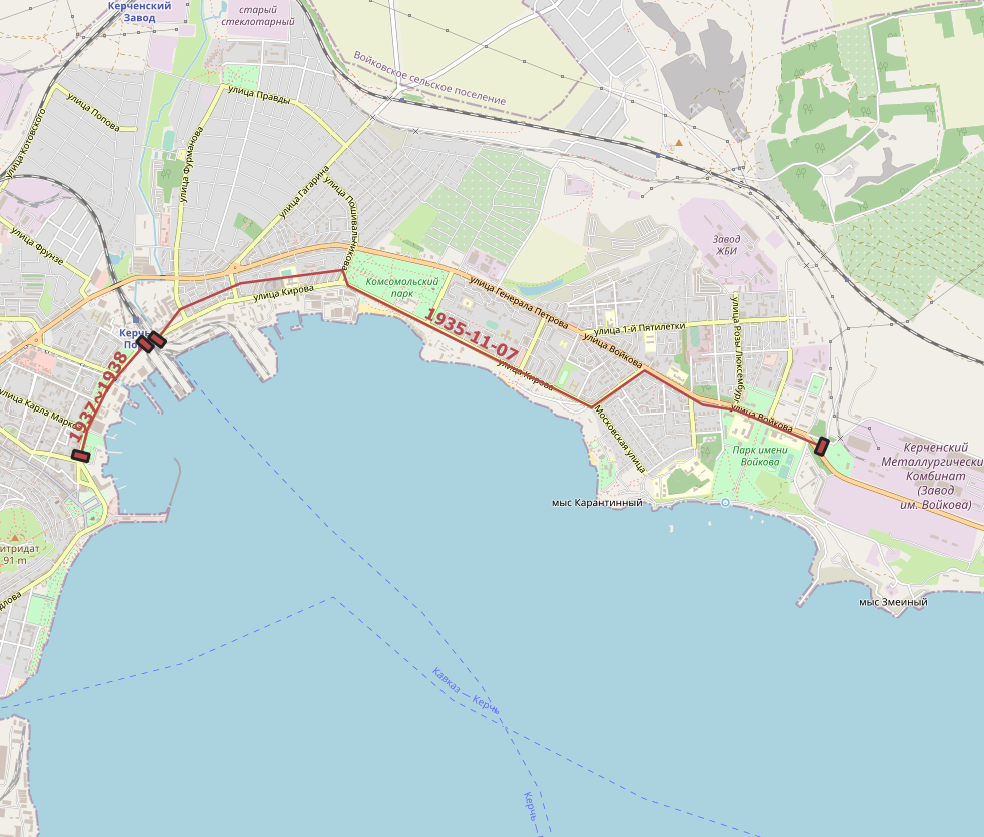
Map of tram lines with opening dates

Kerch had a tram system that was established in 1935 and destroyed in 1941.

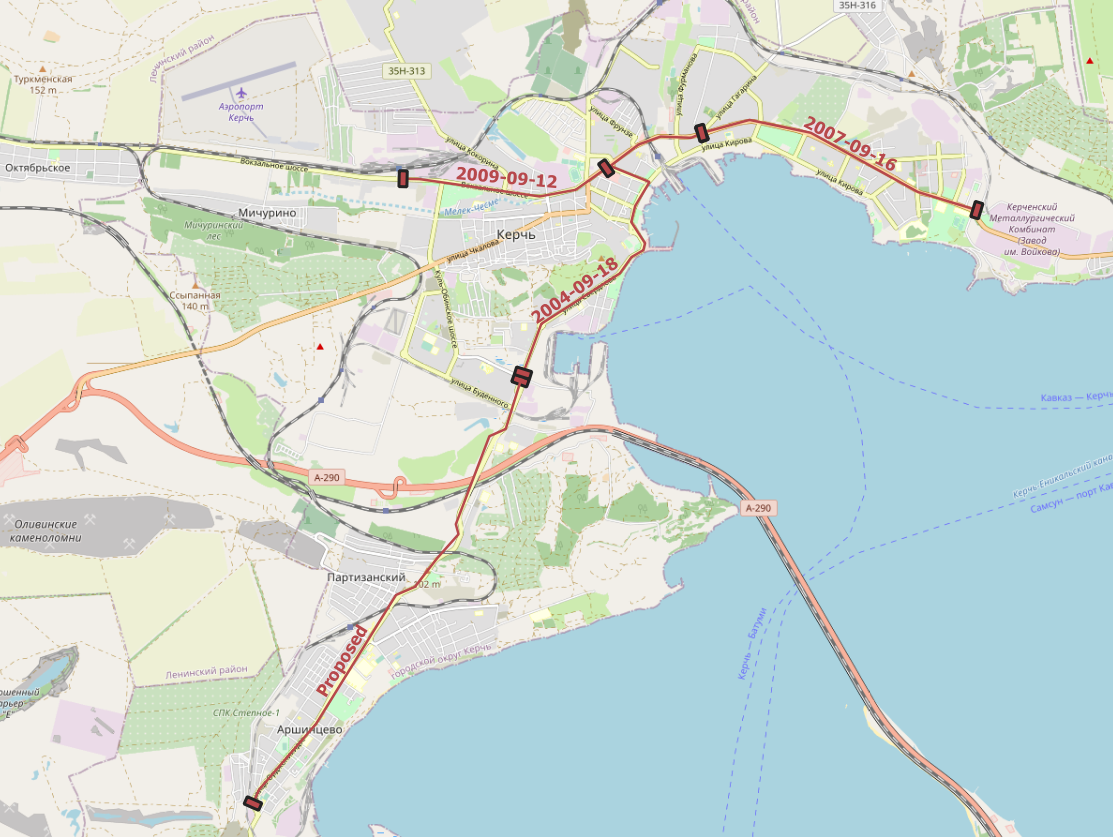
Trolleybus lines map with dates of opening

A trolleybus system was established in 2004, and has one line.

==== Crimean Bridge ====
On 25 April 2010, Ukrainian President Viktor Yanukovych and Russian President Dmitry Medvedev signed an agreement to build a bridge across the Kerch Strait. In January 2015, with Russia now in control, the contract for the construction of the bridge was awarded to Arkady Rotenberg's S.G.M. Group. In May 2015 construction commenced, and the road section of the bridge was opened to traffic in May 2018. The rail section was opened in 2019, with Russian President Vladimir Putin taking the first train across on 23 December. It was heavily damaged by explosions on 8 October 2022, and in 2023 and 2025.

== Culture ==
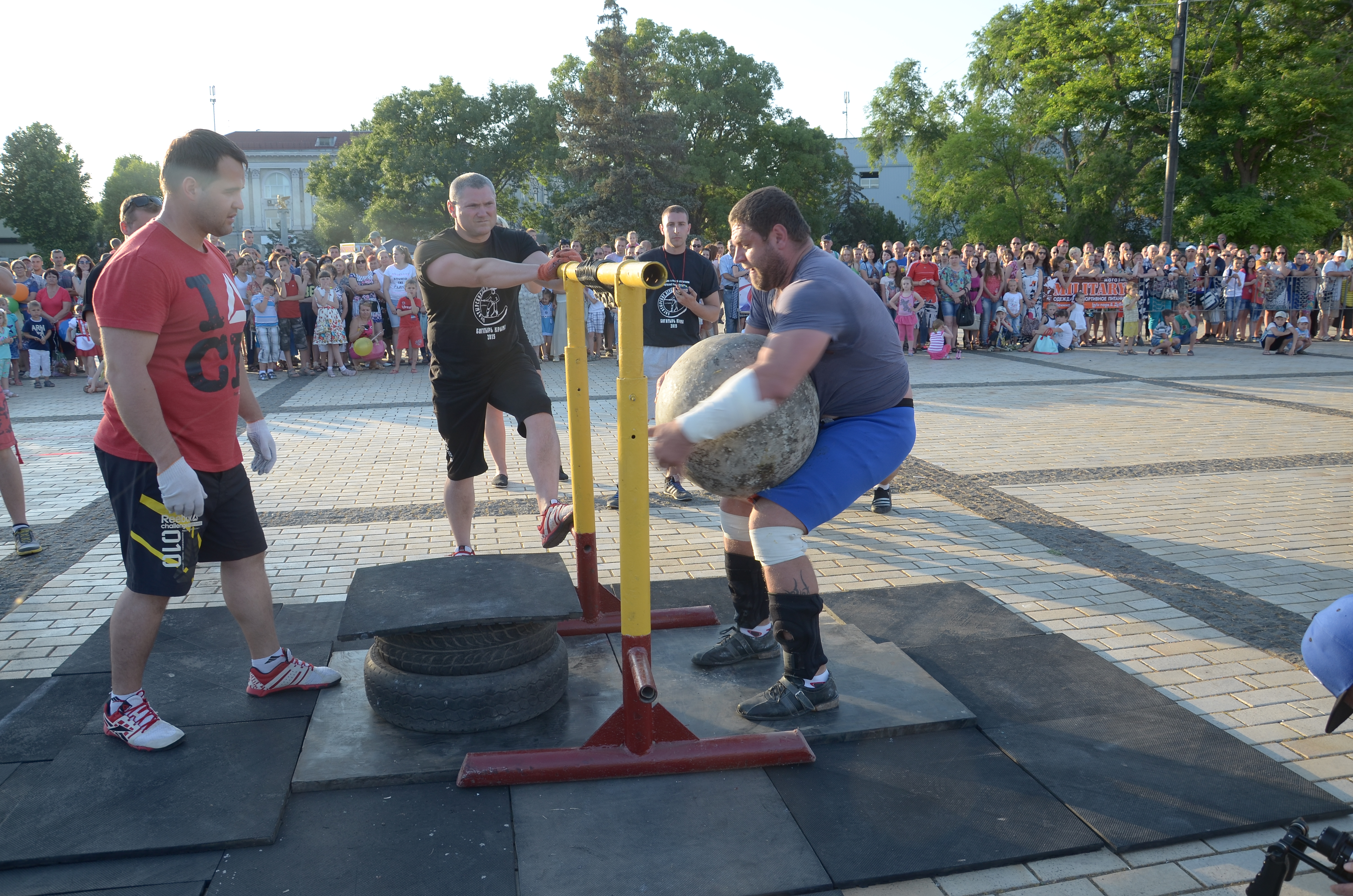
Games of Bogatyrs in Kerch

=== Festivals and celebrations ===
- Liberation Day (11 April)
- Day of Fishermen (the second Sunday of July)
- Day of the City (the second Saturday of September)

=== Education ===
Kerch hosts (2004):

- 28 schools,
- 9 institutes and branches of Ukrainian and Russian universities,
- shipbuilding and polytechnical colleges,
- medical school,
- 6 PTU schools,
- a number of pre-school child institutions

=== Archaeology ===
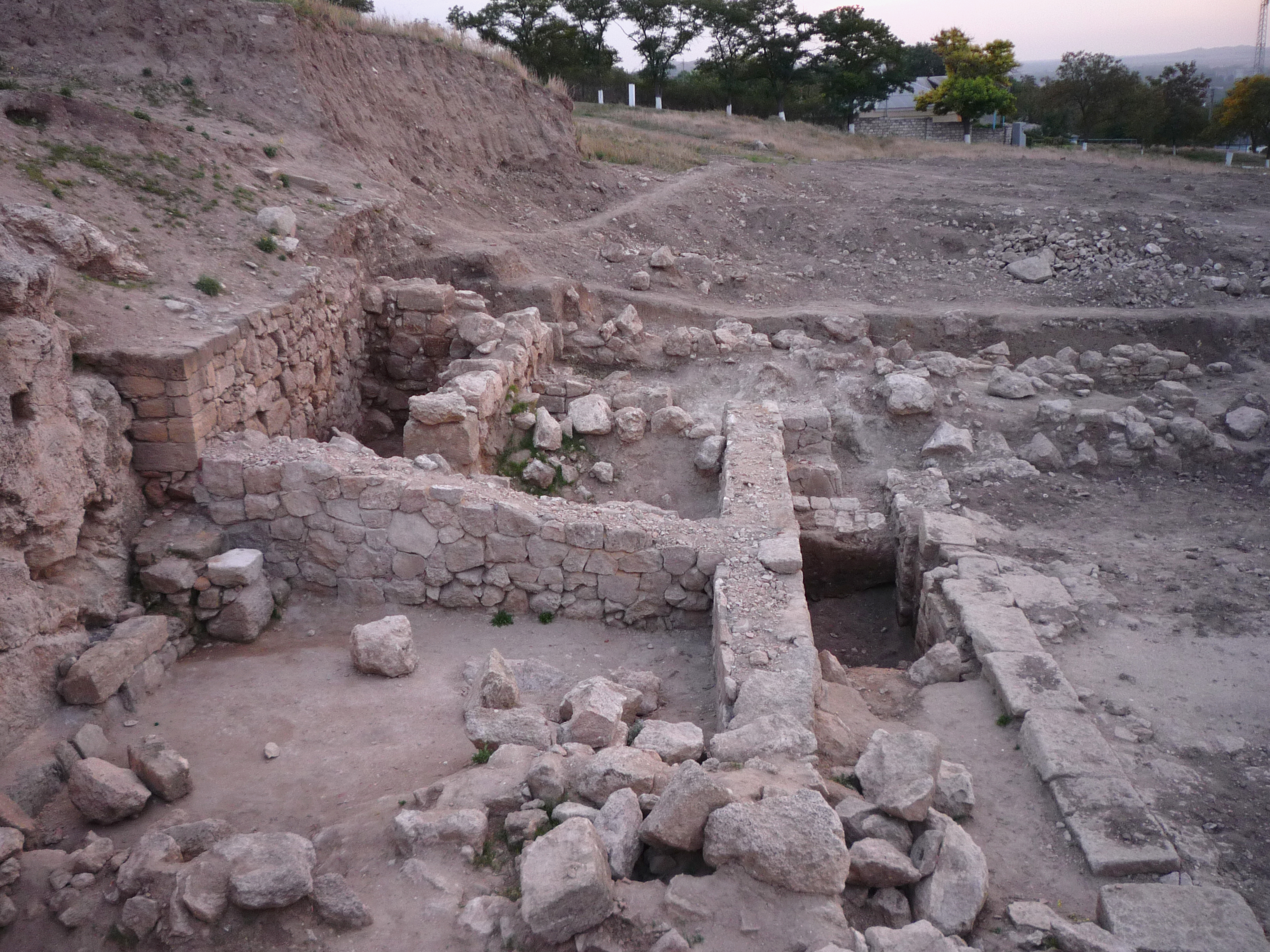
Excavations in Pantikapaeum

Archaeological digs in Kerch were launched under Russian auspices in the middle of the 19th century. Since then the site of ancient Panticapaeum city on Mount Mithridat has been systematically excavated. Located nearby are several ancient burial mounds (kurgans) and excavated cities. Kerch takes part in UNESCO's "Silk Road" programme.
Treasures and historical findings of Kerch adorn the Lapidarium in Kerch and the collections of major museums around the world. Such as: the Hermitage, the Louvre, the British Museum, the Berlin Museum, the Moscow State Museum of fine arts and many others.
Currently, excavations at ancient fortresses of Kerch are led by scientists from Russia, Ukraine, and Poland.

=== Twin towns – sister cities ===
City	Country	Year
Mogilev	Belarus	1998
Smolensk	Russia	1998
Çanakkale	Turkey	1999
Oryol	Russia	2004
Odintsovo	Russia	2004
Sochi	Russia	2005
Kyiv	Ukraine	1997
Tula, Russia	Russia	2014

== Notable people ==
- Luke of Simferopol, (1877–1961), aka Saint Luke the Blessed Surgeon, surgeon and bishop
- Pyotr Voykov (1888–1927), a Ukrainian Bolshevik revolutionary and Soviet diplomat
- Yuri Terapiano (1892–1980), a Russian poet, writer, translator and literary critic
- Jia Ruskaja (1902–1970), a Russian dancer and choreographer
- Paul Soskin (1905–1975), Russian born, British screenwriter and film producer.
- Boris Khodorov (1922–2014), physiologist and professor of physiology
- Alime Abdenanova (1924—1944), a Crimean Tatar scout in the Red Army during WWII.
- Volodia Dubinin (1928–1942), a Pioneer Hero of the Soviet Union
- Vasily Filippenko (1936–1968), known as The Leningrad Strangler, a Soviet serial killer
- Anatoliy Kokush (born 1951), a Ukrainian film engineer, businessman and inventor.
- Yuri Adzhem (born 1953), a Russian former football coach and player with over 330 club caps
- Volodymyr Ivanenko (1954-2006), a Ukrainian television producer
- Sergey Dorenko (1959–2019), Russian TV and radio journalist
- Mikhail Reva (born 1960), a Ukrainian artist, sculptor, architect and jewelry craftsman
- Ihor Leonov (born 1967), a Ukrainian former football midfielder and manager
- Taras Berezovets (born 1975), a Ukrainian activist and political analyst
- Masha Efrosinina (born 1979), a Ukrainian TV host and media personality.
- Ulyana Nesheva (born 1983), a Ukrainian contemporary painter and tattoo artist
- Sevgil Musayeva (born 1987), a Ukrainian journalist
- Valeriya Strakhova (born 1995), a Ukrainian tennis player

== Honours ==
A minor planet 2216 Kerch discovered in 1971 by Soviet astronomer Tamara Mikhailovna Smirnova is named after the city.

== Gallery ==
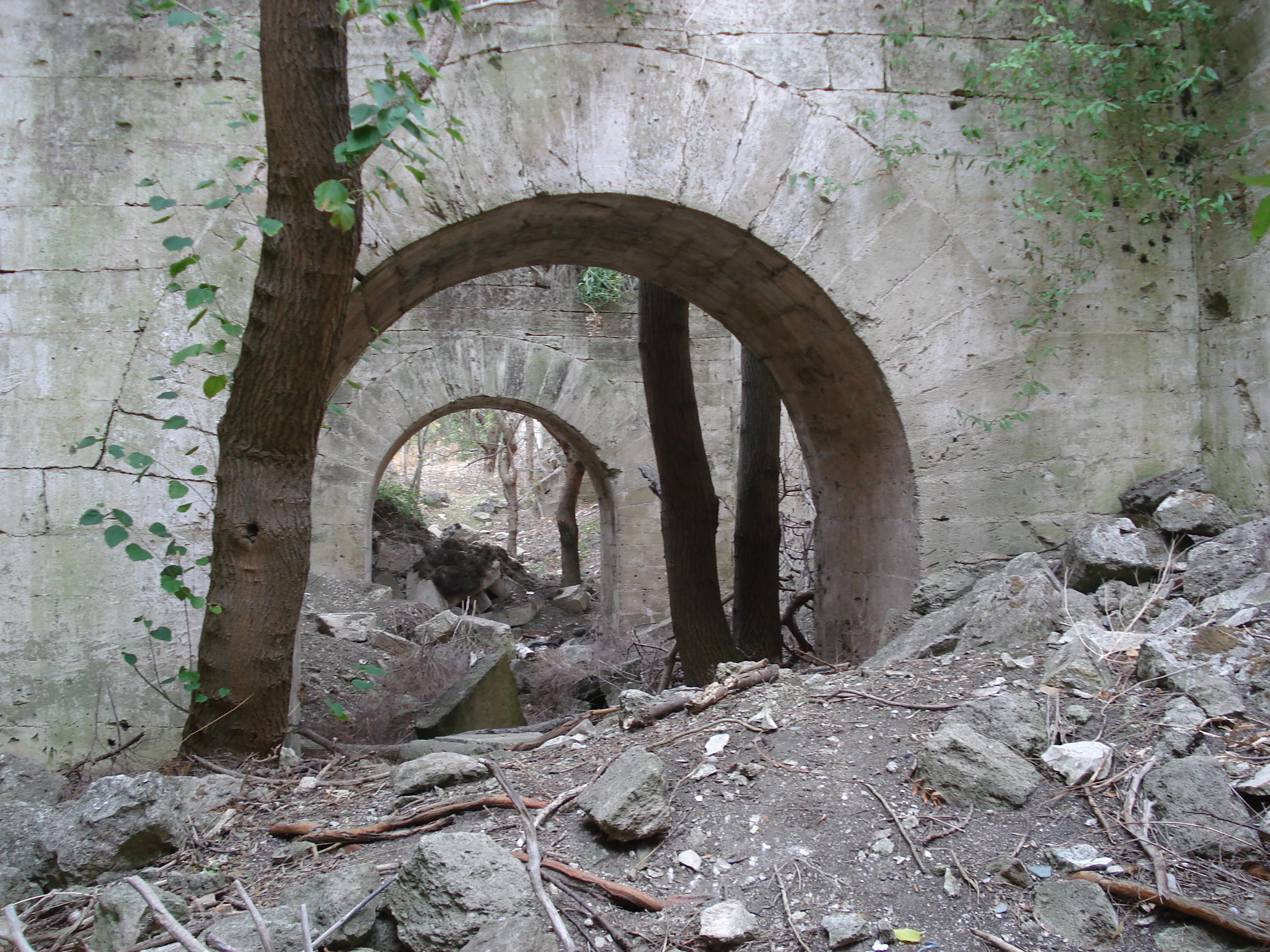
Kerch Fortress

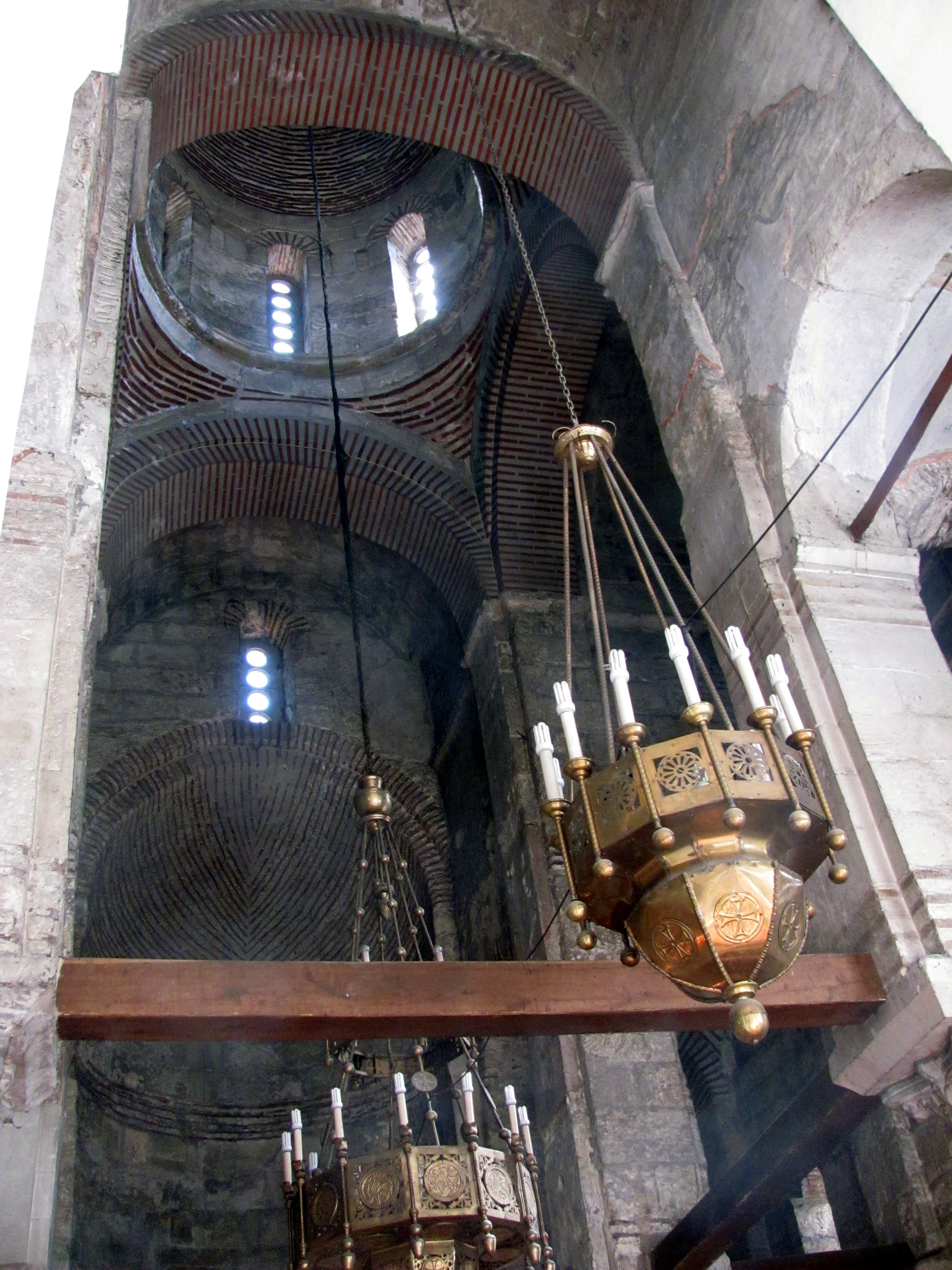
Interior of the Church of Saint John the Baptist

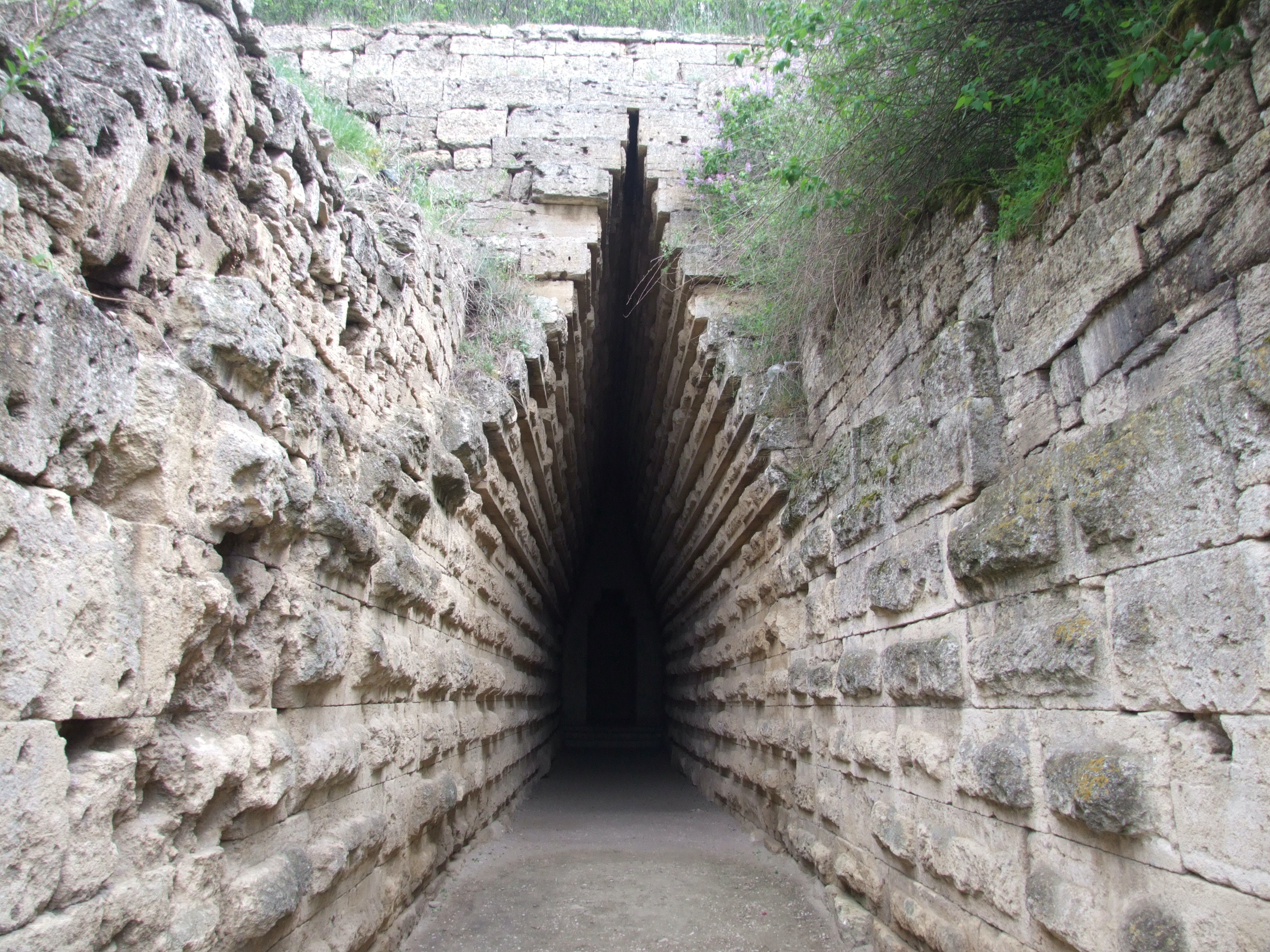
Royal Kurgan entrance.

== See also ==
- Bosporan Kingdom
- Kerch Fortress
- Kerch Polytechnic College massacre
- Kerch Strait
- Mount Mithridat
- Panticapaeum
- Tuzla Island
- Yeni-Kale
