= Bosporus (see) =

Former bishopric in present-day Kerch, Ukraine

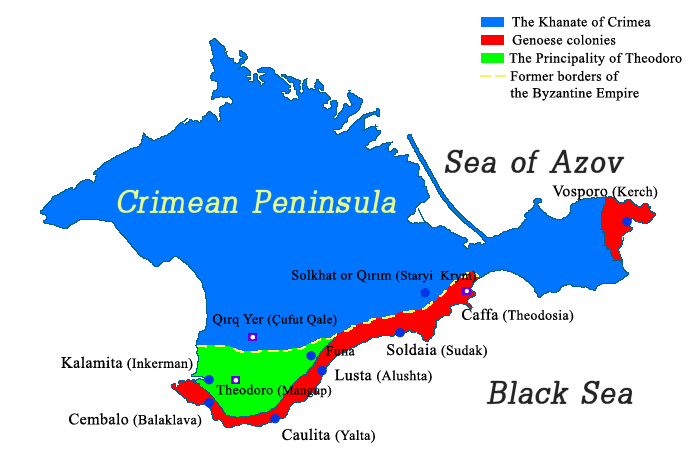
Crimea in the mid-15th century

Bosporus is a former bishopric in the Crimean city now called Kerch but remains a Latin Catholic titular archiepiscopal see.

== History ==
The diocese dates from pre-schism Byzantine rule, persisted under Khazars rule but faded.

== Titular see ==
It was established in 1926 as a Titular archbishopric.

It is vacant, having the following Archiepiscopal (intermediary rank) incumbents :

- Josef Alois Kessler (1930.01.23 – 1933.12.09)
- José Ignacio Márquez y Tóriz (1934.11.17 – 1945.07.28)
- Joseph Charbonneau (1950.02.09 – 1959.11.19)
- Jean-Marie Villot (1959.12.17 – 1965.01.17), while Coadjutor Archbishop of Lyon (France) (1959.12.17 – 1965.01.17), Undersecretary of Central Commission for the Coordination of the Postconciliar Work and the Interpretation of Conciliar Resolutions (1962 – 1965.01.17); previously Titular Bishop of Vinda (1954.09.02 – 1959.12.17), Auxiliary Bishop of Paris (France) (1954.09.02 – 1959.12.17); later (succeeding) Metropolitan Archbishop of Lyon (1965.01.17 – 1967.04.07), Cardinal-Priest of SS. Trinità al Monte Pincio (1965.02.25 – 1974.12.12), Prefect of the Roman Sacred Congregation for the Clergy (1967.04.07 – 1969.04.23), President of Pontifical Commission for the Vatican City State (1969 – 1979.03.09), Papal Secretary of State (1969.05.02 – 1979.03.09), Prefect of Council for the Public Affairs of the Church (1969.05.02 – 1979.03.09), President of Administration of the Patrimony of the Apostolic See (1969.05.02 – 1979.03.09), Cardinal Protector of the Pontifical Ecclesiastical Academy (1969.05.02 – 1979.03.09), Chamberlain of the Holy Roman Church (1970.10.16 – 1979.03.09), President of the Pontifical Council “Cor unum” (1971.07.15 – 1978.09.04), Cardinal-Bishop of Frascati (1974.12.12 – 1979.03.09)
