= Mount Mithridat =

Geographic feature in Crimea

Coordinates: 45.3507°N 36.4701°E

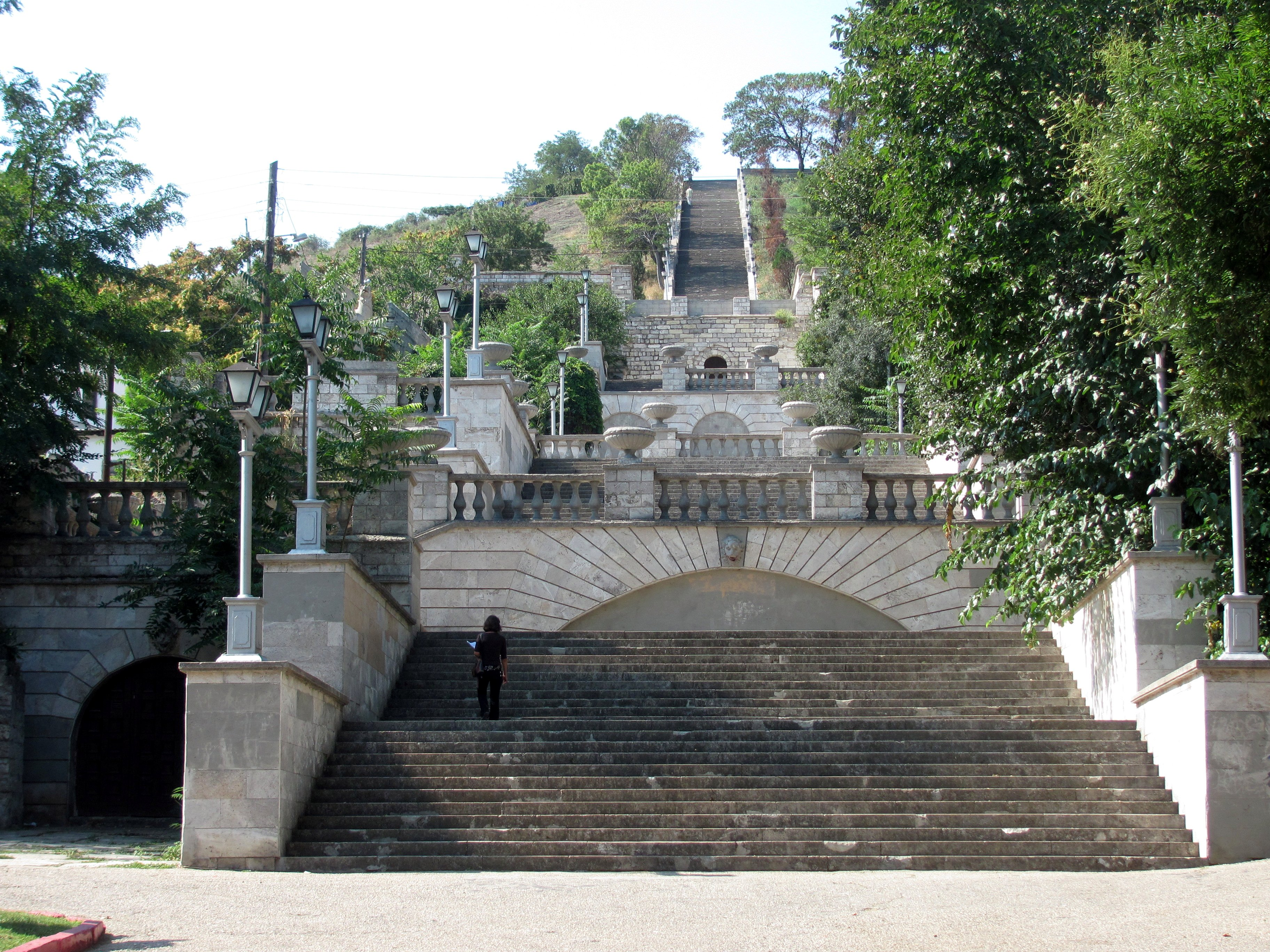
The Great Mithridates Staircase up Mount Mithridat

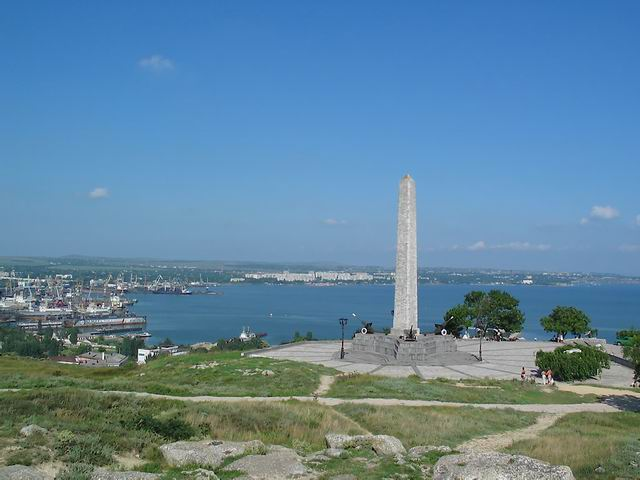
Obelisk of Glory on Mount Mithridat summit

Mount Mithridat is a large hill located in the center of Kerch, a city on the eastern Kerch Peninsula of Crimea. It is 91.4 metres (300 ft) in elevation.

From the top of Mount Mithridat a scenic view spreads across the Strait of Kerch and the city of Kerch. Sometimes it is possible to see the Caucasus shore.

== History ==
Mount Mithridat was named after Mithridates VI of Pontus, ruler of the Kingdom of Pontus and a long-time antagonist of the Roman Republic via the Mithridatic Wars, until he was deceived by his son. After a long siege of Panticapaeum, he tried to kill himself several times, until finally he was killed by the leader of his own guardsmen.

The Great Mithridates Staircase leads to the top of Mount Mithridat, in a series of flights and balustraded terraces. It was built in 1833–1840 by the Italian architect Alexander Digbi. In the present day, a road also goes to the top of the mountain.

In the 19th century, a museum was erected on the top of the mountain in the form of a Greek temple, but it was destroyed during the Second World War. In 1944, a memorial obelisk was built at the summit to commemorate the soldiers that defended Kerch in World War II. The landmark mountain was one of the nominees for the Seven Wonders of Ukraine.
