= Vasily Filippenko =

Soviet serial killer and rapist

- Born: Vasily Efimovich Filippenko; 1936; Kerch, Crimean ASSR, RSFSR
- Died: November 1968 (aged 31–32); Leningrad, RSFSR
- Cause of death: Execution by shooting
- Other names: "The Leningrad Strangler" "The Strangler from Obvodny Canal" "Steel Fingers" "Absolute Evil"
- Years active: 1967
- Conviction: Murder
- Penalty: Death

Details
- Victims: 5
- Country: Soviet Union
- State: Leningrad
- Date apprehended: 1968

Vasily Efimovich Filippenko (Russian: Васи́лий Ефи́мович Филиппе́нко; 1936 – November 1968), known as The Leningrad Strangler (Russian: Ленинградский душитель), was a Soviet serial killer and rapist, operating in Leningrad in the area of the Obvodny Canal.

== Biography ==
Filippenko was born in Kerch, where he lived for the first 30 years of his life. He worked as a crane operator in a port, when one day he fell off from a great height, receiving serious injuries (about 17 fractures). During treatment, his wife, believing that he would remain disabled for life, filed for divorce. However, he recovered, but Filippenko became hostile towards the opposite sex. In 1966, he moved to Leningrad, where he also got a job as a crane operator at a port, living in a dorm room with a propiska. At work, he was characterized as positive, and was part of the Voluntary People's Druzhina.

=== Crimes ===
In 1967, in the Obvodny Canal area, Filippenko began attacking women in the evening. When investigating the crimes, it was suggested that the people the maniac chose as victims were women whom he saw parting with another man.

The first crime was committed on the night of 23–24 May 1967. The victim of the maniac was 19-year-old "Red Triangle" factory worker Nina Petukhova. While giving his testimony during the investigation, Filippenko stated: the future victim, after parting with the sailor accompanying her, decided to meet him herself while standing on the embankment of the Obvodny Canal; they reached the round-the-clock kindergarten located near the Canal and the women's hostel of the Red Triangle plant; during a conversation on the territory of the kindergarten, the girl reminded him of his ex-wife, and so he beat, raped and then strangled her. On the night of the murder, the on-duty kindergarten teachers heard the girl's screams but thought they were unimportant. Two hairs belonging to the killer were found in the girl's right hand. The rapist's sperm was also detected, by which his blood type was determined.

The suspect became a merchant seaman named Sergei Sergeyev, with whom Petukhova had met on 23 May. An hour after breaking up with the girl, he went back to his ship, which heightened the police's suspicions. When Sergeyev arrived on the ship, information came that the law enforcement officers were interested in him - he was then isolated and after returning to the port, he was transferred to the officers of the criminal investigation department and the prosecutor's office. But soon after, Sergeyev was released, as his blood type and hair samples did not coincide with those found at the murder scene; the kindergarten teachers on duty at night said that they had heard Petukhova's cries around midnight, and she had broken up with him an hour earlier, which was confirmed by the records in the ship's journal. During an interrogation, Sergeyev said that before parting with Petukhova, he saw a man in a hat and a raincoat on the bridge over the Obvodny Canal - it later turned out to be Filippenko.

In July, Filippenko committed a new attack. The maniac's second victim also met him at night in the area of the Obvodny Canal, as he had proposed to conduct the meeting. Not far from the girl's house, he beat, strangled her unconscious and then raped her, but did not murder the girl (or possibly couldn't).

The investigators suggested that the offender lived in the Obvodny Canal area, and cards were taken from passport offices. The surviving victim was shown photos taken in the Obvodny Canal area, and she identified the attacker as 24-year-old worker Igor Vorobyev, who was arrested. Experts showed that his blood group coincided with that of the murderer, but his hair sample did not match up with the one found at Petukhova's murder scene. Despite this fact, Vorobyev was accused of rape but wasn't charged with the murder of Nina Petukhova as there was insufficient evidence. The testimony of his wife, who claimed that he was at home on the night of the crime, was ignored. Four months later, the court sentenced Vorobyev to 6 years in prison, but he continued to deny his guilt. The fact that between the arrest of Vorobyev and his trial, the real maniac committed two more crimes was not taken into account. In law enforcement, it was decided not to link the second crime with the previous and subsequent attacks on women in the Obvodny Canal area, and the blood type coincidence was declared accidental.

Even before Vorobyev's trial, an incident occurred in Leningrad, calling into question the testimony of the maniac's surviving victim. In September 1967, an LPI student was arrested in Lenin Park, who had attacked and tried to strangle his friend. Although this attack was not similar to the crimes in the Obvodny Canal area, the arrestee was investigated for his involvement in Petukhova's murder, but his blood type did not match. However, he was presented in a police lineup to the surviving victim, in which she, again, recognized the attacker. It later turned out that the victim suffered from myopia, but did not wear glasses. This fact was not taken into account, and the Vorobyev case was brought to court.

The next murder was committed on the territory of the Botkin Hospital. His victim was 25-year-old nurse, Tatyana Kuznetsova, who was on duty that night. On the hospital grounds, the maniac found her accidentally: he was chasing another woman, but he lost sight of her - she entered one of the buildings of the hospital. Then, in the courtyard, Filippenko attacked Kuznetsova, raping and then strangling her. Unlike previous episodes, when the maniac did not touch the victim's belongings, this time he took the money from the nurse's handbag. The woman who escaped noticed that she was being pursued and turned to police in the morning, but her application was not accepted. Initially, the murder of Tatyana Kuznetsova was not associated with the murder of Nina Petukhova, the hospital staff and patients were checked for any involvement. Only when the tests did not produce results, did the investigation draw attention to the similarity of details in both cases.

Filippenko committed his fourth crime on the night of 18 October, on this day there was a flood in Leningrad and the city streets were practically deserted. On the embankment of the Obvodny Canal, he attacked Galina Ivanova, dragging her to a nearby construction site, where she was raped and strangled with her own tights.

After the third murder, the investigators began to check individuals previously convicted for sexual offences and those registered in psycho-neurological dispensaries. Police and people's guards began to patrol the area of the Obvodny Canal. Attempts were made to catch the maniac with "live bait". The Leningrad City Committee of the CPSU allowed for limited information to be published in the newspapers and on the radio about the criminal situation in the city.

In the same month, Filippenko committed a new crime in the Obvodny Canal area, his victim being LTI student, Faina Anchak. He attacked the girl near her home, raping her and then attempting to strangle her. As the examination established, Anchak could've survived, but during the strangulation, the offender broke her hyoid bone, which caused her trachea to swell. As a result of the injury, the girl could not call for help and died from suffocation.

The next murder caused dissatisfaction with the party leadership of the city. In the city committee, they demanded that the prosecutor's office and the police find the criminal within three days. The number of patrols in the Obvodny Canal area was increased, and attempts to catch the maniac with "live bait" were renewed.

In early November, on Nevsky Prospect, the druzhinniks detained and took to the police station 26-year-old Viktor Danilov, who attacked women on the street. The detainee belonged to the "golden youth" category (his father held a senior position in the urban construction sector, and his mother was a famous doctor in Leningrad), who had no job. It was revealed that he had intellectual disability. Three hours after his arrest, he was released but was left under secret police surveillance. A few days later, a search and seizure was conducted on Danilov's apartment, during which porn magazines were found and a collection of curls from female hair, which the suspect cut off from women whom he pestered on the street. Danilov was detained again and presented for identification to the maniac's surviving victim. The victim confirmed that the detainee had molested her on the same day, but she had met him before meeting the maniac. However, the investigator forced the girl to change her testimony and for the third time she "identified her abuser". Danilov was re-arrested, and an examination determined that he coincidentally had the same blood type as the maniac. Under pressure from the investigators, he confessed to attacking women in the Obvodny Canal area and even wrote a confession. The party leadership of Leningrad subsequently announced that they had captured the maniac.

At this time, Filippenko struck again, killing a fish shop saleswoman named Valentina Stennikova. This time, he threw the victim's body into the Obvodny Canal. After the body's discovery, the examination established that the girl had been raped and killed. It was found that the same maniac, who supposedly had been captured, had committed the murder. Fearing a scandal, the results of the examination were falsified, and the mention of rape was removed. Instead, it was announced that Stennikova had been intoxicated and had committed suicide. A criminal case was denied. The girl's parents tried to protest the refusal in the prosecutor's office and at the CPSU city committee without success.

=== Arrest, trial and punishment ===
At the beginning of 1968, Filippenko, using a trade union voucher, went to Yalta. There, he was arrested when he tried to rape and strangle the sanatorium maid, and was placed at a detention centre in Simferopol. In the cell, he told his cellmate, who was a police informant, about his crimes in Leningrad. This information was sent to Leningrad, where investigators were sent to Simferopol to interrogate the confessor. During interrogation, Filippenko spoke in detail about the five Leningrad murders in the area of Obvodny Canal, reporting on many significant details that no outsider could know about. The offender was taken to Leningrad, where his testimony was checked and fixed during investigative experiments. In addition, it turned out that Filippenko, as a druzhinnik, helped the police search for the maniac, and in effect, was searching for himself.

The criminal case against the intellectually disabled Viktor Danilov, who had implicated himself, was discontinued and he was released. The condemned Igor Vorobyev was released from detention and rehabilitated. For the errors committed, six employees of the prosecutor's office were dismissed.

Filippenko tried to avoid the court by pretending to be insane, but a comprehensive forensic psychiatric examination found him to be sane. In 1968, the court sentenced Vasily Filippenko to death through firing squad. In November, the sentence was carried out.

== In the media ==
- "Absolute Evil" - Documentary film from the series "The investigation led..."
- "Steel fingers" - Documentary film from the series "Legends of Soviet Investigation"

== See also ==
- List of Russian serial killers

== Literature ==
- A. I. Rakitin (2016). Socialism does not breed crime. Yekaterinburg: Cabinet Scientist.
