= Colegio De La Salle =

- La Salle
- Colegio De La Salle
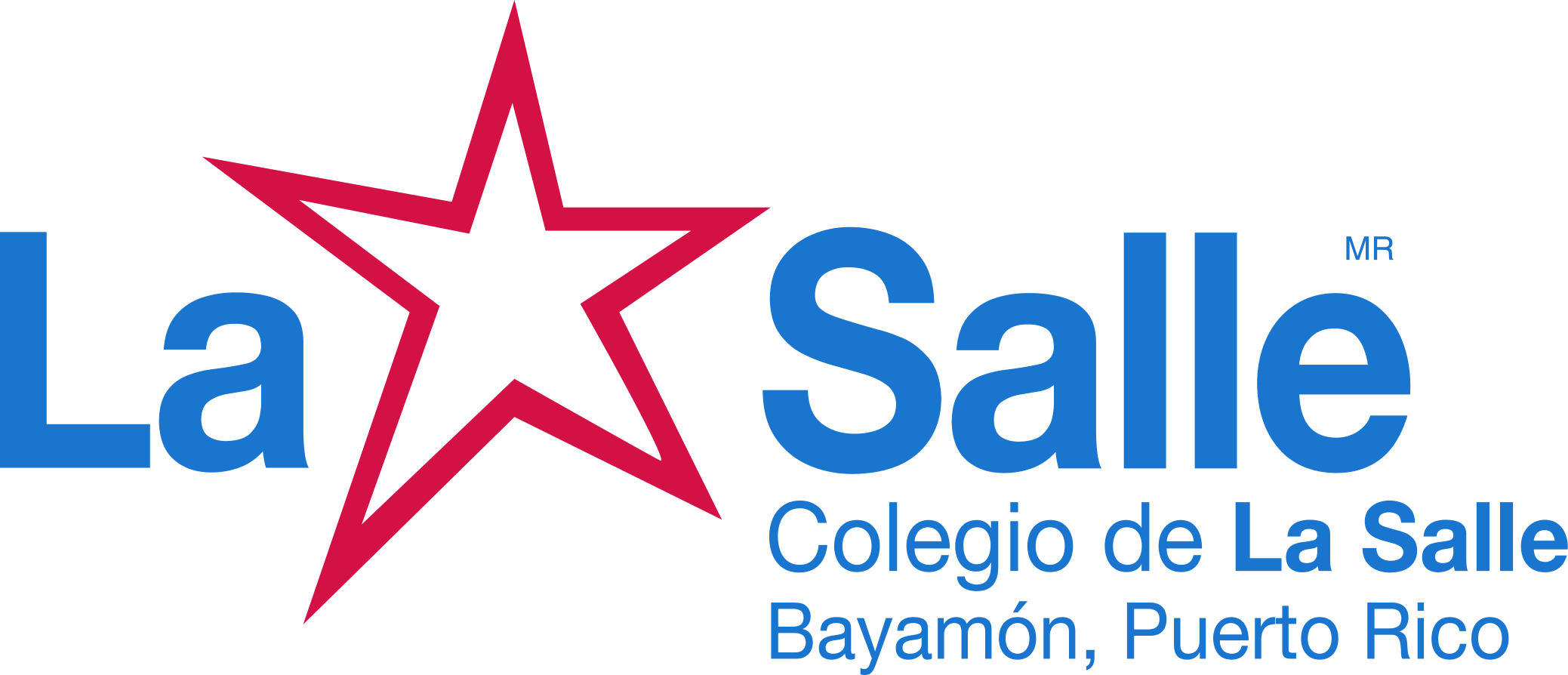

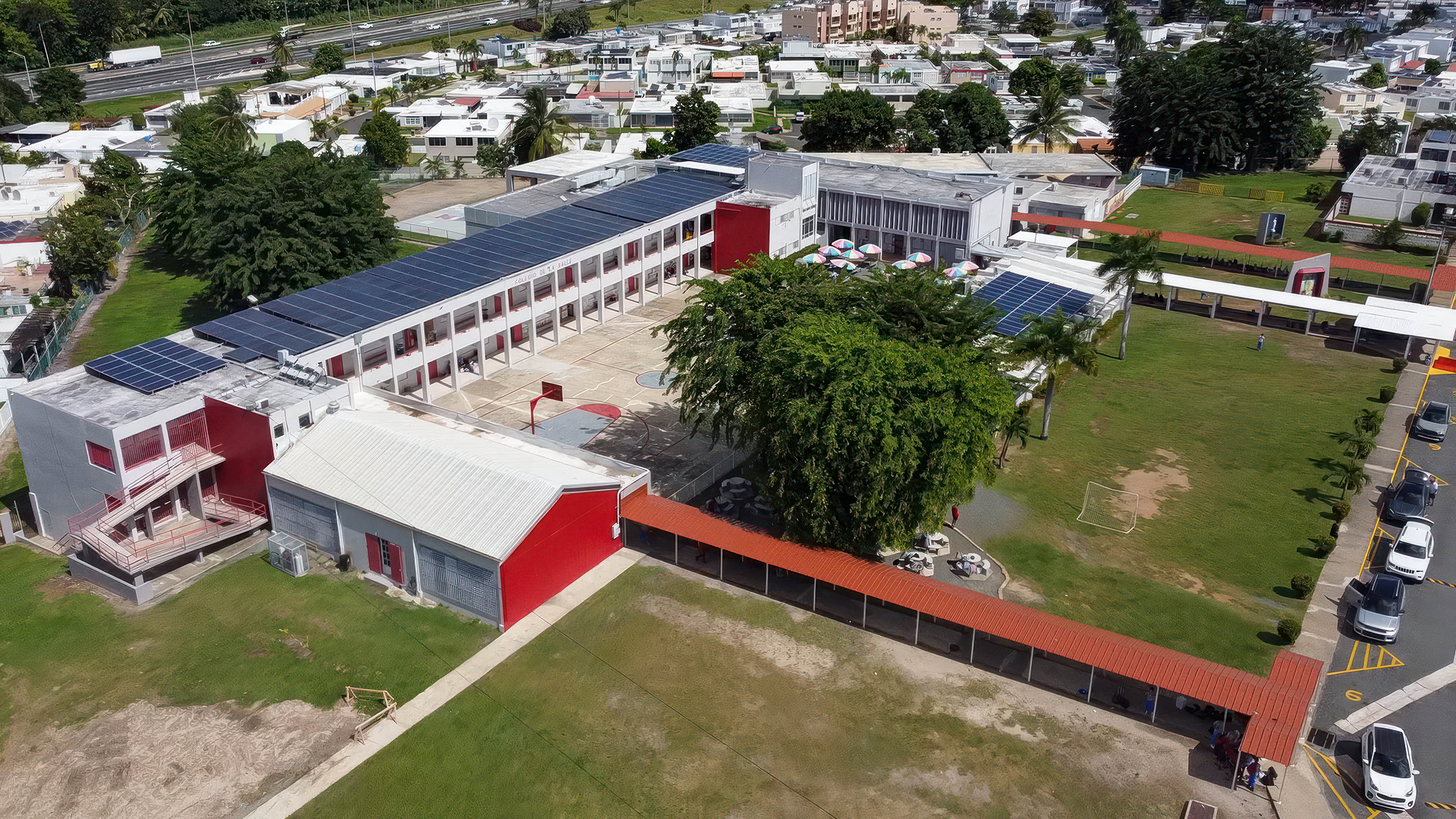
- Aerial view of the school

Location
- Calle San Bautista De La Salle final Bayamon, PR 00960 United States; Bayamón, Puerto Rico; Bayamón; Puerto Rico; 18°25′06″N 66°10′03″W

Information
- Type: Private School
- Established: August 15, 1962
- Founder: Institute of the Brothers of the Christian Schools
- Status: Open
- School district: DENA
- Category: Private School
- Grades: Kinder - 12
- Gender: Mixed (Boys & Girls)
- Mascot: Tigre y Tigresa
- Accreditation: Departamento de Educación de Puerto Rico, Consejo General de Educación.
- Website: https://delasallebayamon.com/

Colegio De La Salle is a Lasallian educational institution located in Bayamón, Puerto Rico. It is the only De La Salle institution open on the island. The other was located in Añasco but it is now closed. Established at the Riverview suburb in Bayamón, Puerto Rico on August 15, 1962, the institution has been in service for over 50 years. Initially, the institution merely offered middle-through-high school education, but has since expanded to a K-12 curriculum.

== Notable alumni ==
- Xavier Serbia, Puerto Rican economist and former actor and singer, member of boy band Menudo.
