= Kerch Fortress =

18th century Crimean fortress

Kerch
- Fort Totleben
- Crimea
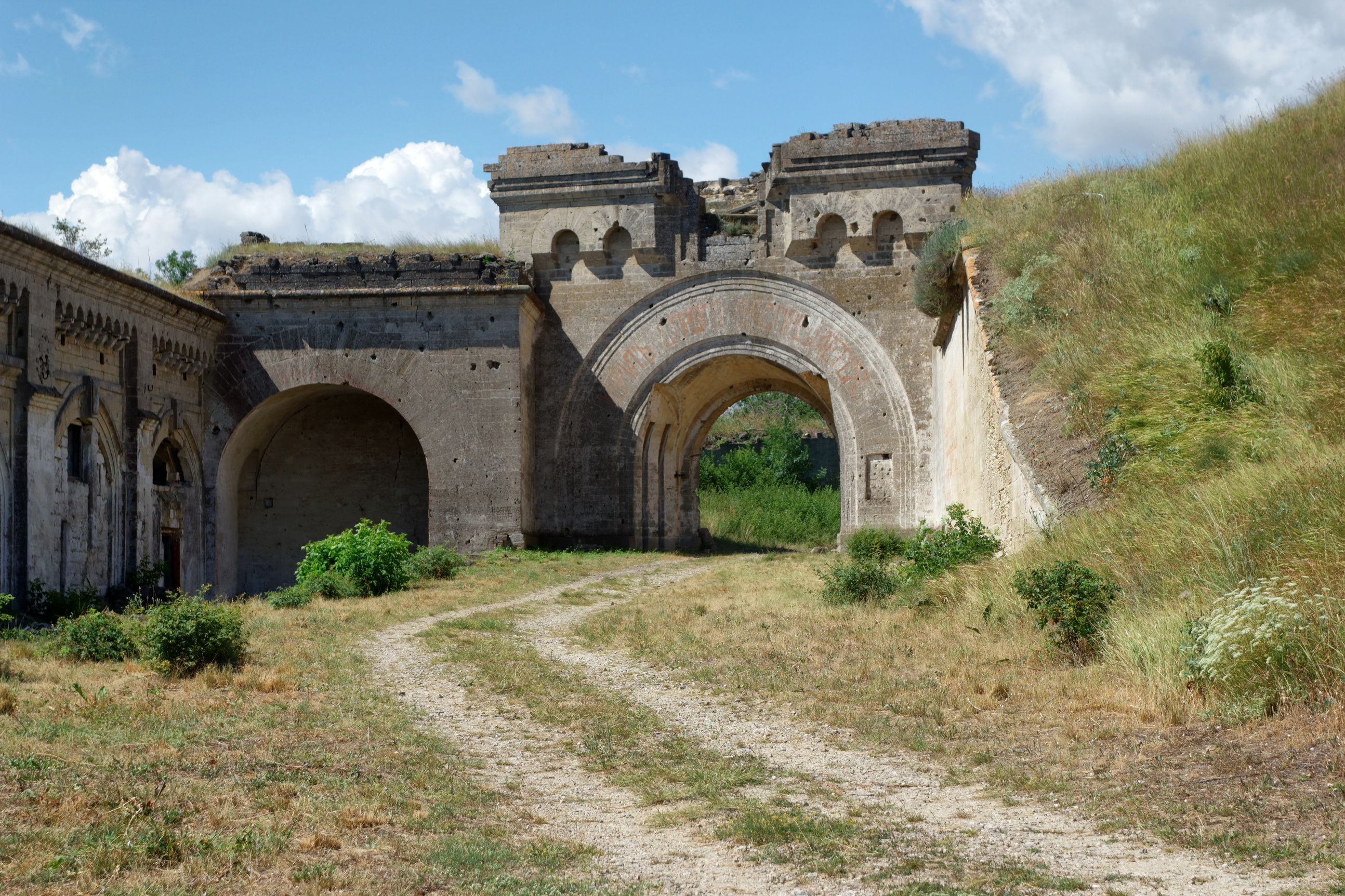
- Gate of fortress Kerch

Site information
- Owner: public property
- Open to the public: yes
- Condition: good, partly destroyed

Location
- Location on Europe map
- Location within Crimea
- Coordinates: 45°18′53.856″N 36°28′47.114″E

Site history
- Built: 1857–1865
- Built by: Eduard Totleben
- In use: defence of Kerch Strait
- Materials: Stone

Immovable Monument of National Significance of Ukraine
- Official name: Комплекс споруд Керченської фортеці (Building complex of the Kerch fortress)
- Type: History, Science and Technology
- Reference no.: 010013

Kerch Fortress (Fort Totleben) is a fortress in eastern Crimea, located on Cape Ak-Burun (lit. 'White Cape') at the narrowest point of the Kerch Strait. Built in the 19th century, the fortress was originally intended to protect the southern border of the Russian Empire.

== History ==
The first fortress in the Kerch Strait was built in 1771. The first battery was built at the cape and later named Pavlovskij. Subsequently, the fort was rebuilt several times and armed. During the Crimean War, the battery was equipped with 20 guns. The Treaty of Paris proclaimed the Black Sea as neutral zone and forbade Russia from placing their fleet or military ports in the area. However, the treaty allowed for the fortification of the Kerch Strait. In April 1856, Kerch combat units were sent to study local conditions and photograph locations. The experienced military engineer Colonel Anton Antonovich supervised the construction work, which also began in 1856.

In October 1859, Eduard Ivanovich Totleben was appointed Director of the Engineering Department of the Ministry of War and gained the Tsar's support for strengthening Kerch. He drew on experience gained in the siege and defense of the fortress, as well as his defense of Sevastopol.

In 1861, excavation work started at Ak-Burun cape.

In 1861 emperor Alexander II visited the fortress for the first time.

In 1867, Kerch fortress opened.

When the Tsar visited the fortress in 1872, work on the defensive constructions was completed, and he was "very pleased with the finish of coastal batteries."

== USSR ==
During the existence of the Soviet Union, the fortress housed a military warehouse with equipment and ammunition for the Black Sea navy forces, as well as for a disciplinary battalion. After the collapse of the Soviet Union, military units began to disband. In 2003, the fortress territory was transferred to the Kerch State historical and cultural reserve.

== Twenty-first century ==
The fort is protected by the State and is a landmark of Kerch and the Crimea.

== Gallery ==
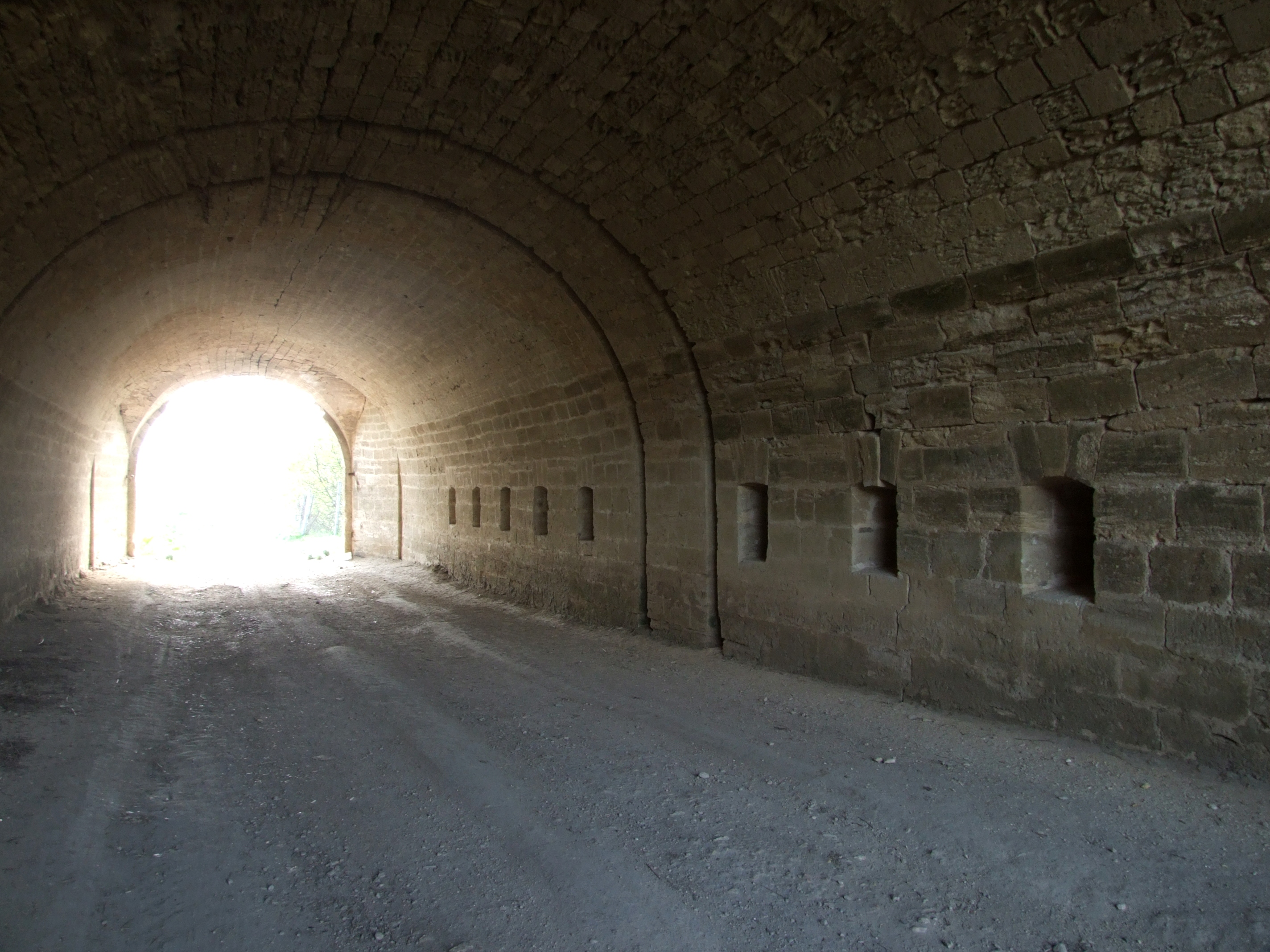
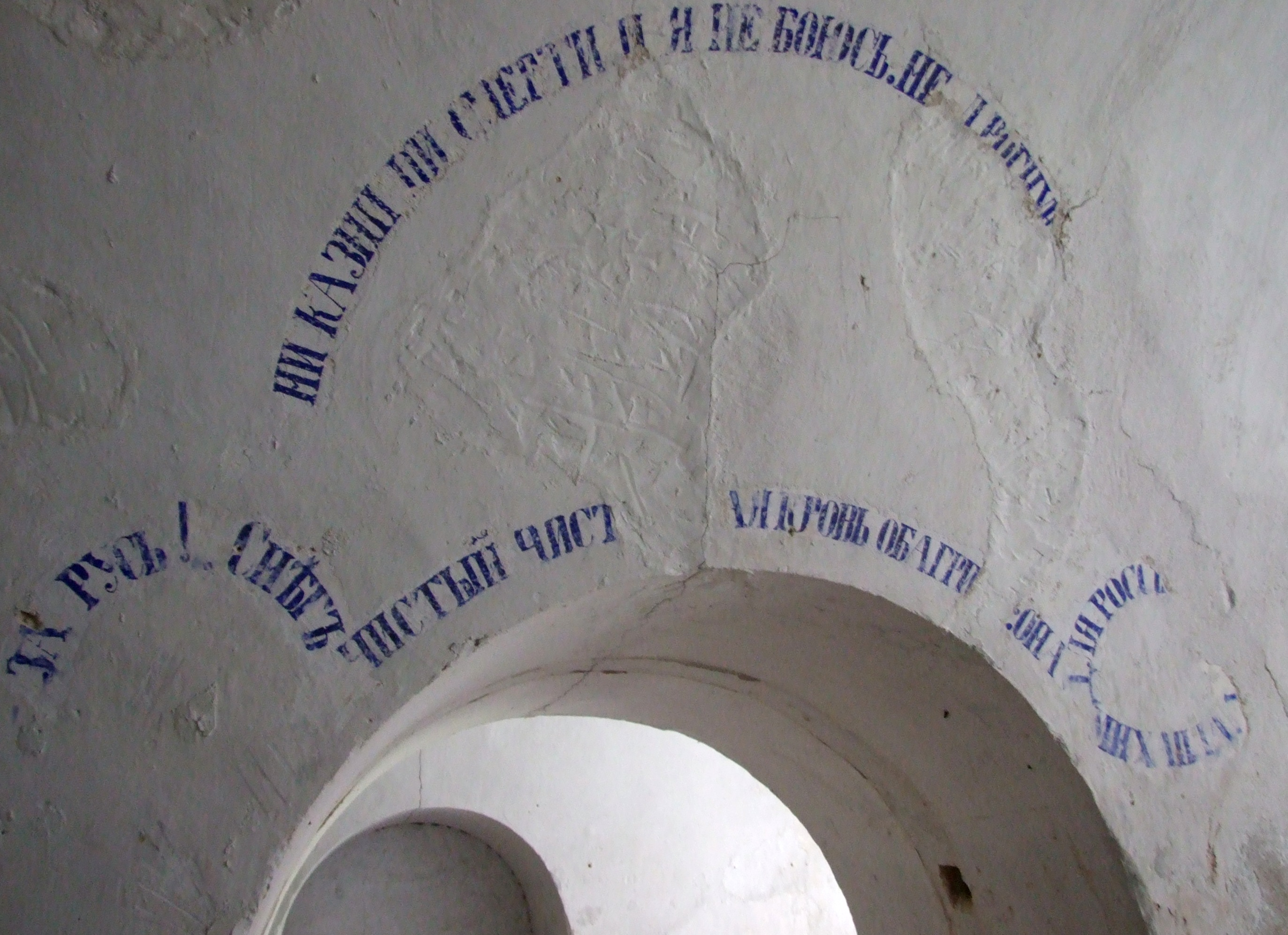
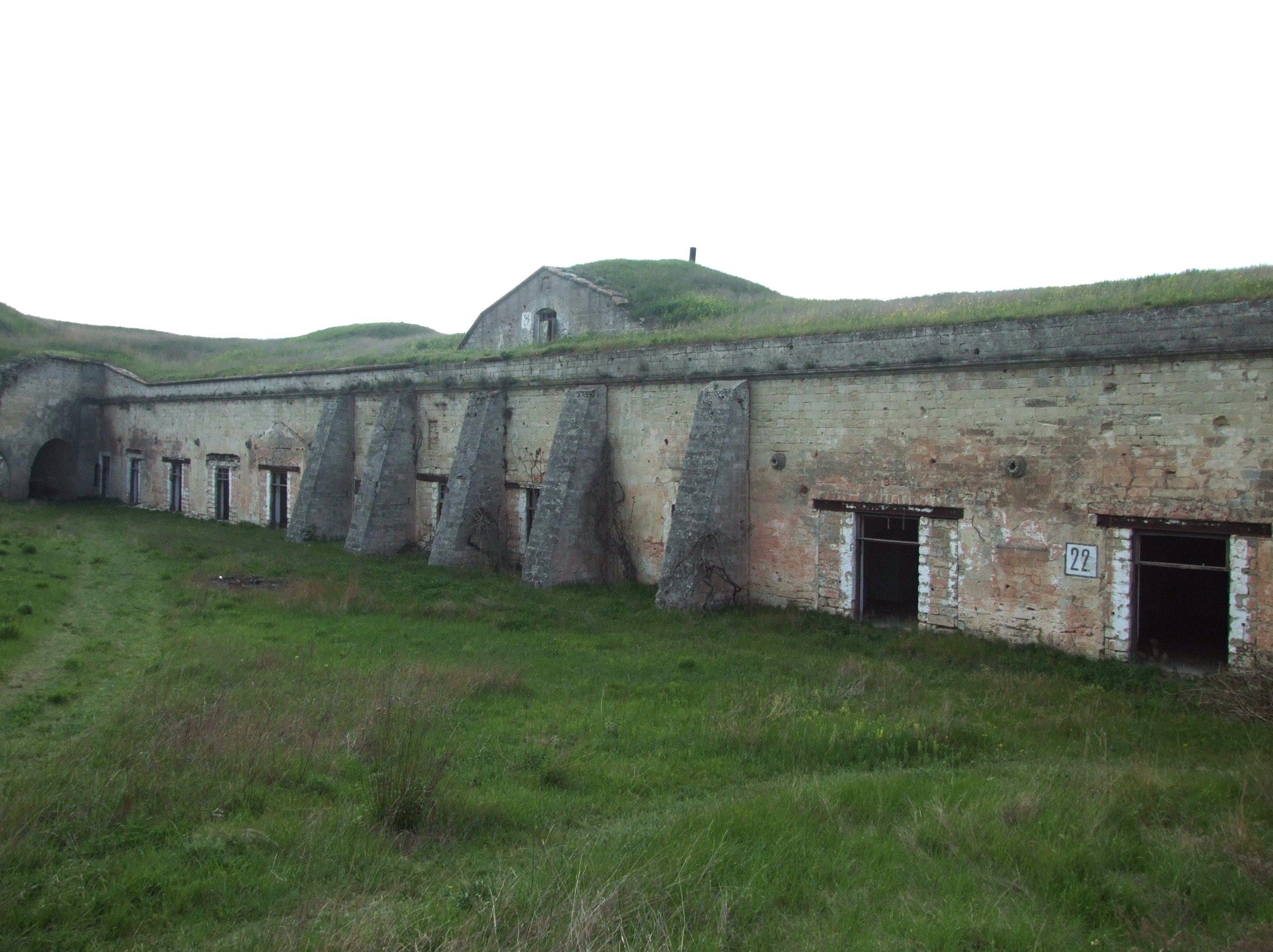
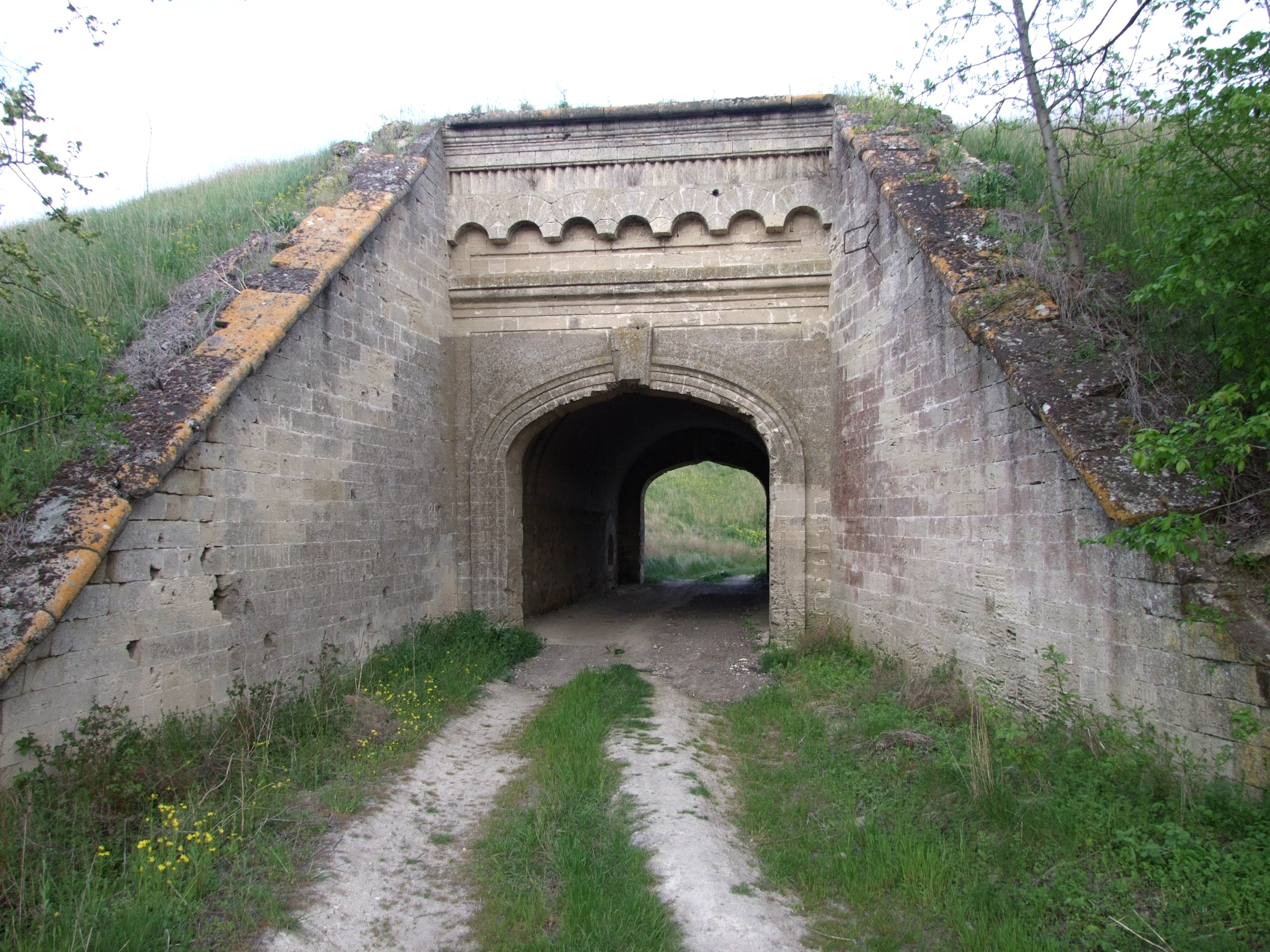
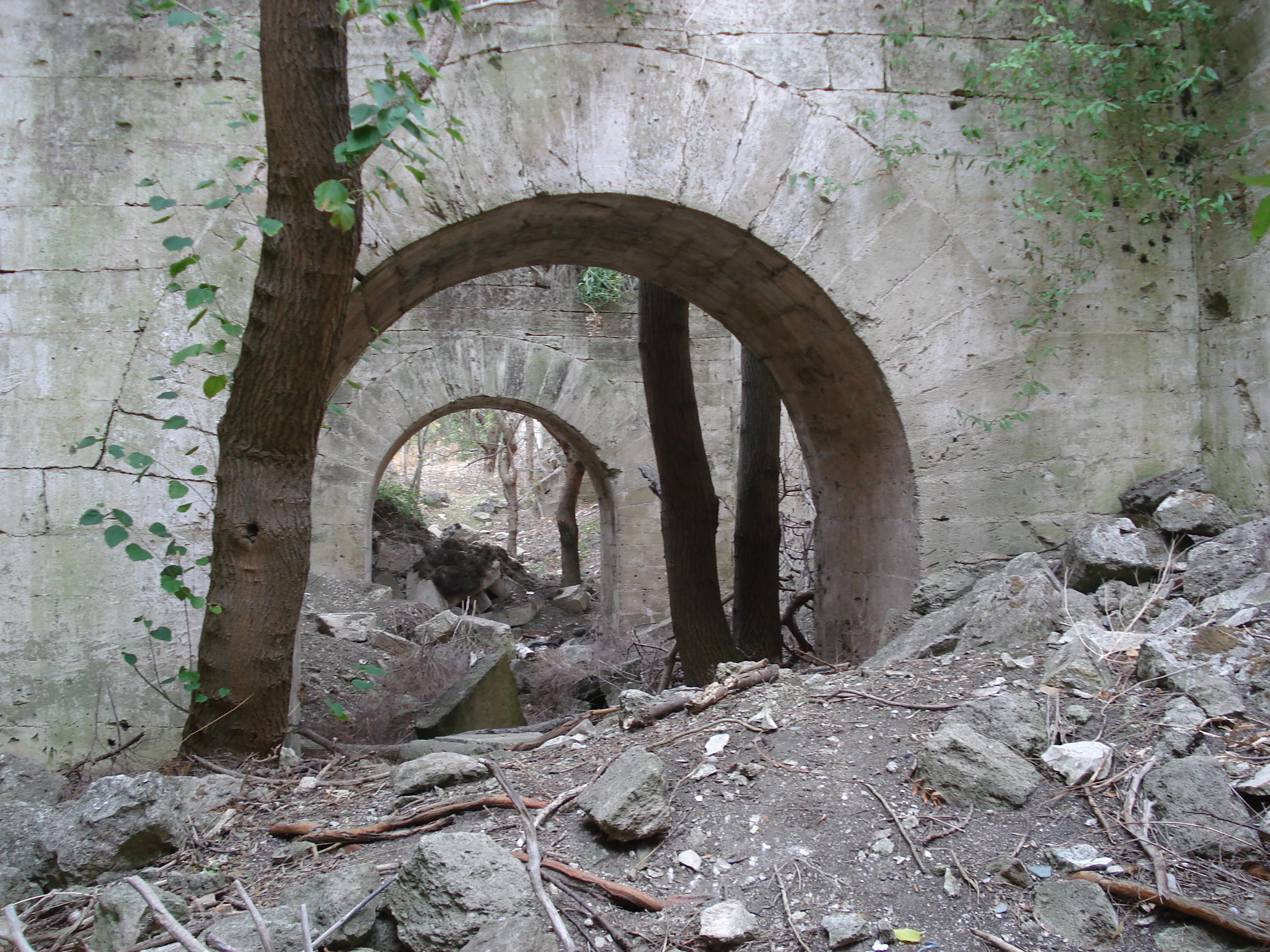
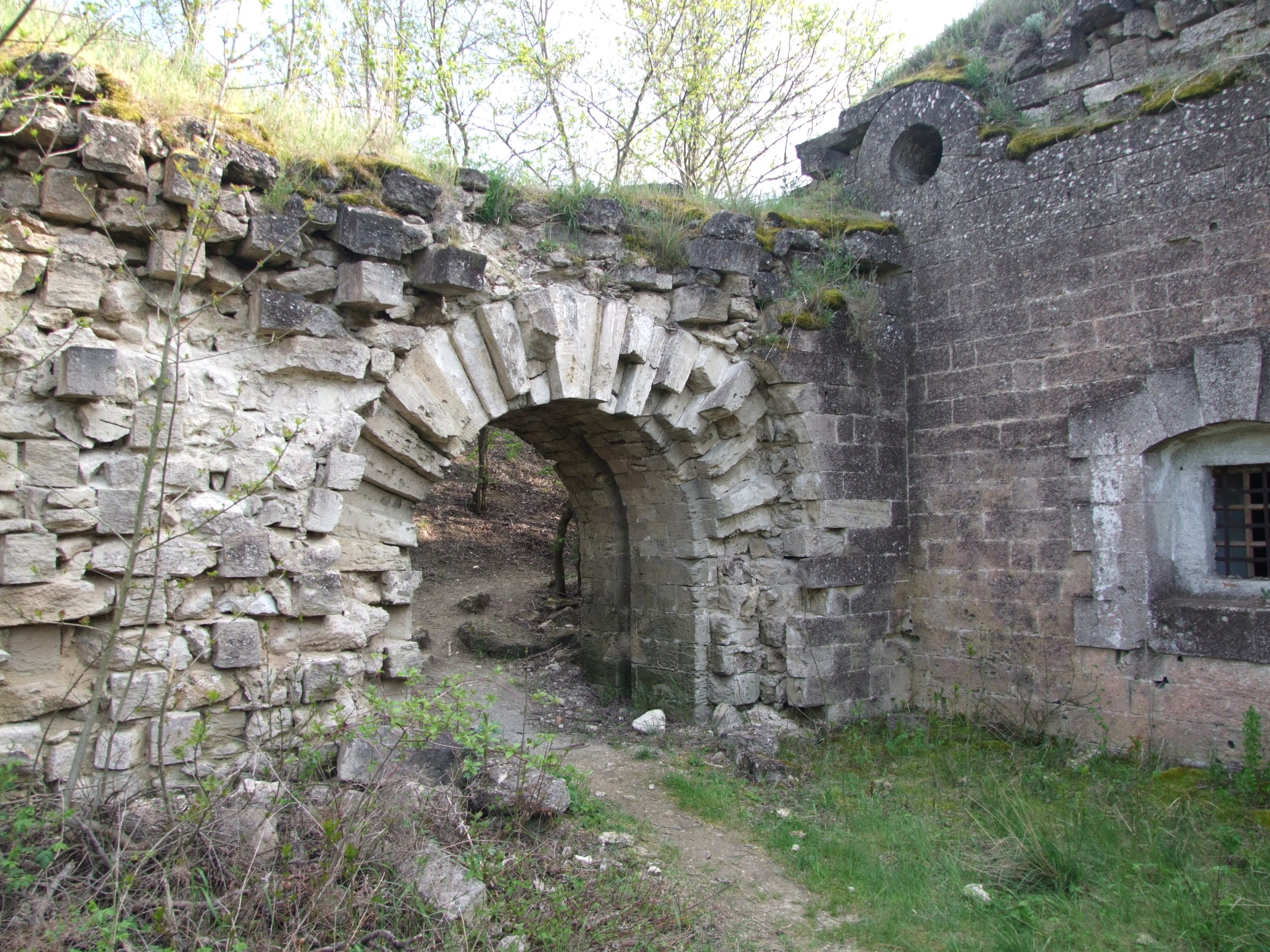
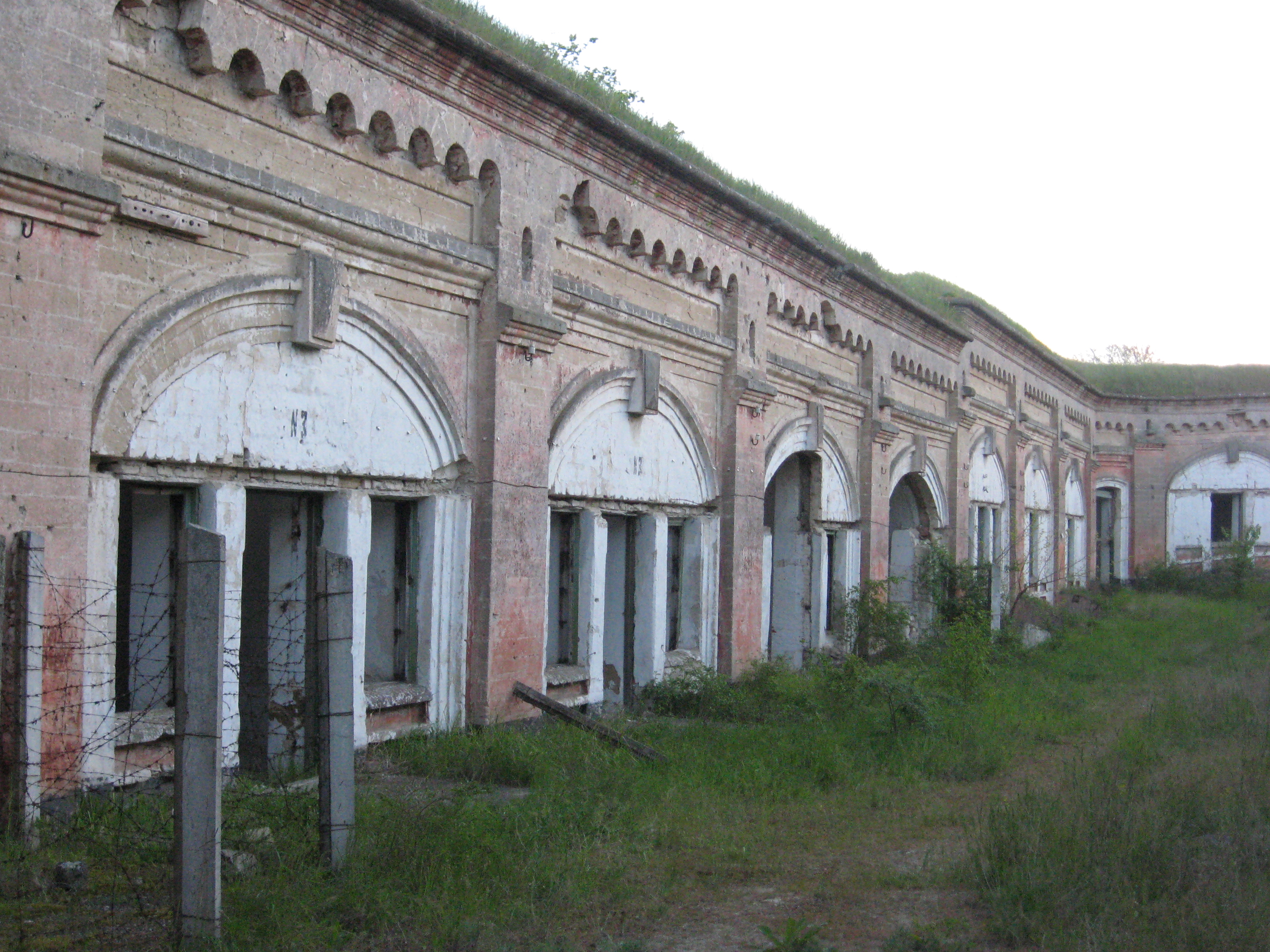
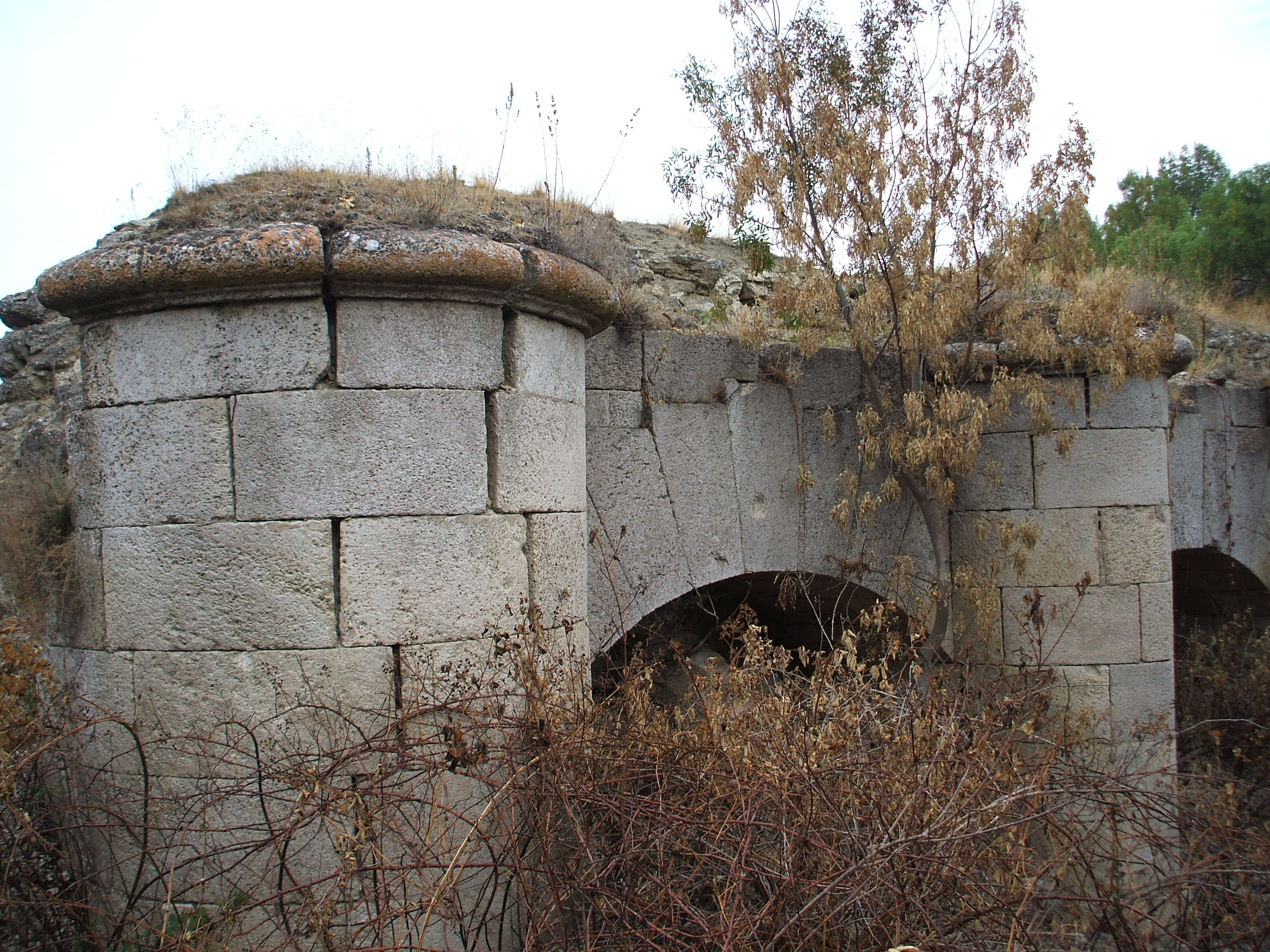
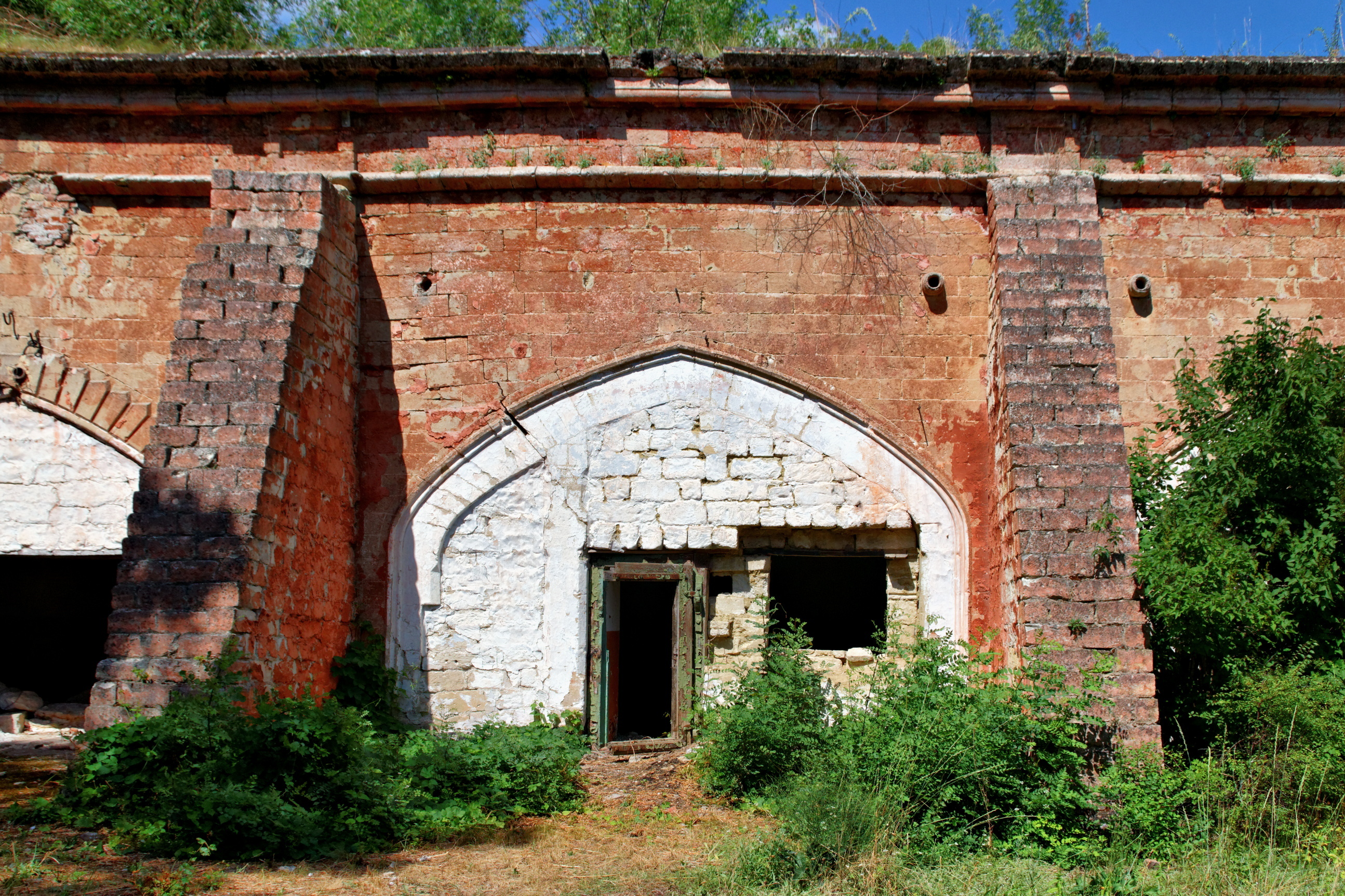
