= Starukhin =

Starukhin, feminine Starukhina is a Russian surname. Notable people with the surname include:

- Viktor Starukhin, native name of Victor Starffin (1916-1957), Japanese baseball player
- Vitaliy Starukhin (1949–2000), Soviet and Ukrainian footballer
- Vsevolod Starukhin (born 1971), Russian businessperson
