= History of Ukraine =

Prehistoric Ukraine, as a part of the Pontic steppe in Eastern Europe, played an important role in Eurasian cultural events, including the spread of the Chalcolithic and Bronze Ages, Indo-European migrations, and the domestication of the horse.

A part of Scythia in antiquity, Ukraine was largely settled by Greuthungi, Getae, Goths, and Huns in the Migration Period, while southern parts of Ukraine were previously colonized by Greeks and then Romans. In the Early Middle Ages it was also a site of early Slavic expansion. The hinterland entered into written history with the establishment of the medieval state of Kievan Rus', which emerged as a powerful nation but disintegrated during the High Middle Ages, and was destroyed by the Mongol Empire in the 13th century.

During the 14th and 15th centuries, present-day Ukrainian territories came under the rule of four external powers: the Golden Horde, the Crimean Khanate, the Grand Duchy of Lithuania and the Crown of the Kingdom of Poland. The latter two would then merge into the Polish–Lithuanian Commonwealth following the Union of Krewo and Union of Lublin. Meanwhile, the Ottoman Empire emerged as a major regional power in and around the Black Sea, through protectorates like the Crimean Khanate, as well as directly-administered territory.

After a 1648 rebellion of the Cossacks against the Polish–Lithuanian Commonwealth, Hetman Bohdan Khmelnytsky agreed to the Treaty of Pereyaslav in January 1654. The exact nature of the relationship established by this treaty between the Cossack Hetmanate and Russia remains a matter of scholarly controversy. The agreement precipitated the Russo-Polish War of 1654–67 and the failed Treaty of Hadiach, which would have formed a Polish–Lithuanian–Ruthenian Commonwealth. In consequence, by the Treaty of Perpetual Peace, signed in 1686, the eastern portion of Ukraine (east of the Dnieper River) was to come under Russian rule, 146,000 rubles were to be paid to Poland as compensation for the loss of right-bank Ukraine, and the parties agreed not to sign a separate treaty with the Ottoman Empire. The treaty was strongly opposed in Poland and was not ratified by the Polish–Lithuanian Sejm until 1710. The legal legitimacy of its ratification has been disputed. According to Jacek Staszewski, the treaty was not confirmed by a resolution of the Sejm until its 1764 session.

During the Great Northern War, Hetman Ivan Mazepa allied with Charles XII of Sweden in 1708. However, the Great Frost of 1709 greatly weakened the Swedish army. Following the Battle of Poltava later in 1709, there was a diminishment in Hetmanate power, culminating with the disestablishment of the Cossack Hetmanate in the 1760s and the destruction of the Zaporozhian Sich in the 1770s. Following the Partitions of Poland (1772–1795) and the Russian conquest of the Crimean Khanate, the Russian Empire and Habsburg Austria were in control of all the territories that constitute present-day Ukraine for over a hundred years. Ukrainian nationalism developed in the 19th century.

A chaotic period of warfare ensued after the Russian Revolutions of 1917, as well as a simultaneous war in the former Kingdom of Galicia and Lodomeria following the dissolution of the Habsburg monarchy after World War I. The Soviet–Ukrainian War (1917–1921) followed, in which the Bolshevik Red Army established control in late 1919. The Ukrainian Bolsheviks, who had defeated the national government in Kyiv, established the Ukrainian Soviet Socialist Republic, which on 30 December 1922 became one of the founding republics of the Soviet Union. Initial Soviet policy on the Ukrainian language and Ukrainian culture made Ukrainian the official language of administration and schools. Policy in the 1930s turned to Russification. In 1932 and 1933, millions of people in Ukraine, mostly peasants, starved to death in a devastating famine, known as the Holodomor. It is estimated that 6 to 8 million people died from hunger in the Soviet Union during this period, of whom 4 to 5 million were Ukrainians.

After the Soviet Union and Nazi Germany invaded Poland in September 1939, the Ukrainian SSR's territory expanded westward. Axis armies occupied Ukraine from 1941 to 1944. During World War II, elements of the Ukrainian Insurgent Army fought for Ukrainian independence against both Germany and the Soviet Union, while other elements collaborated with the Nazis, assisting them in carrying out the Holocaust in Ukraine and their oppression of Poles. In 1953, Nikita Khrushchev, ethnic Russian former head of the Communist Party of Ukraine, succeeded as head of the Communist Party of the Soviet Union and enabled more political and cultural freedom, which led to a Ukrainian revival. In 1954 the republic expanded to the south with the transfer of Crimea from Russia. Nevertheless, political repressions against poets, historians and other intellectuals continued, as in all other parts of the USSR.

Ukraine became independent again when the Soviet Union dissolved in 1991. This started a period of transition to a market economy, in which Ukraine suffered an eight-year recession. Subsequently however, the economy experienced a high increase in GDP growth until it plunged during the Great Recession.

A prolonged political crisis began on 21 November 2013, when president Viktor Yanukovych suspended preparations for the implementation of an association agreement with the European Union, instead choosing to seek closer ties with Russia. This decision resulted in the Euromaidan protests and later, the Revolution of Dignity. Yanukovych was then impeached by the Ukrainian parliament in February 2014. On 20 February, the Russo-Ukrainian War began when Russian forces entered Crimea. Soon after, pro-Russian unrest enveloped the largely Russophone eastern and southern regions of Ukraine, from where Yanukovych had drawn most of his support. An internationally unrecognized referendum in the largely ethnic Russian Ukrainian autonomous region of Crimea was held and Crimea was de facto annexed by Russia on 18 March 2014. The War in Donbas began in Donetsk and Luhansk oblasts of Ukraine involving the Russian military. The war continued until 24 February 2022, when Russia launched a major invasion of much of the country.

== Prehistory ==
=== Paleolithic period ===
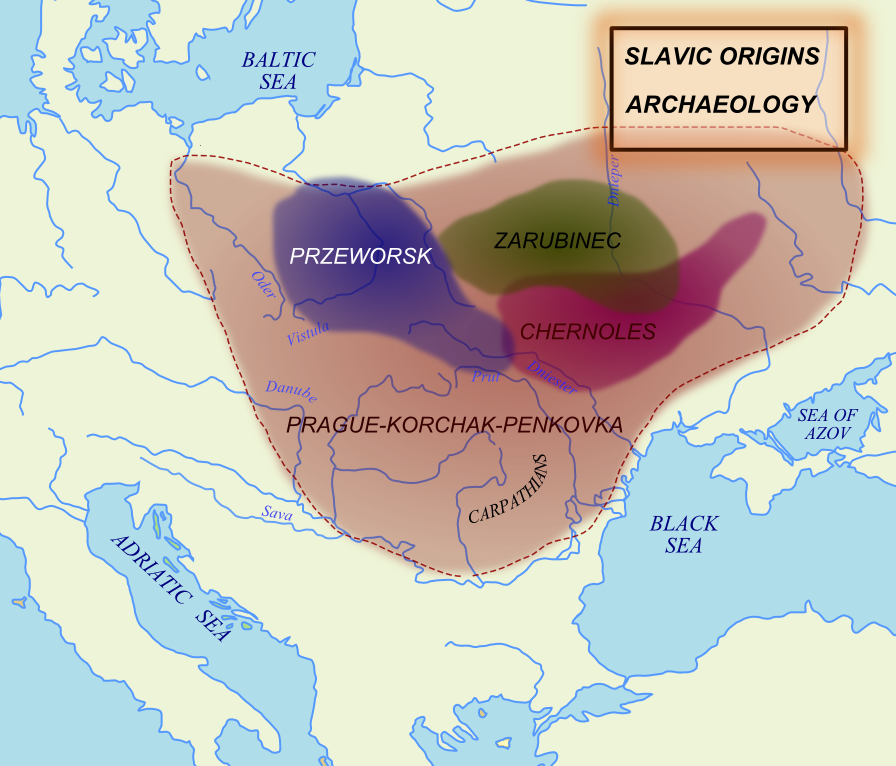
Archaeological cultures associated with proto-Slavs and early Slavs: Chernoles culture (before 500 BC), Zarubintsy culture (300 BC to AD 100), Przeworsk culture (300 BC to AD 400), Prague-Korchak horizon (6th to 7th century, Slavic expansion)

Settlement in Ukraine by members of the genus Homo has been documented into distant Paleolithic prehistory. The discovery of 1.4-million-year-old stone tools in Korolevo, located in western Ukraine, marks one of the earliest securely dated presences of hominins in Europe. These tools offer crucial insights into the behaviors and adaptive strategies of early members of the genus Homo, likely Homo erectus, as they expanded into the continent during the Lower Paleolithic period. The Neanderthals are associated with the Molodova archaeological sites (45,000–43,000 BC), which include a mammoth bone dwelling. The earliest documented evidence of modern humans are found in Gravettian settlements dating to 32,000 BC in the Buran-Kaya cave site of the Crimean Mountains.

Extent of the Chalcolithic Yamna or "pit grave" culture, 3rd millennium BC

=== Neolithic and Bronze Age ===
In the late Neolithic times, the Cucuteni-Trypillian Culture flourished from about 4,500–3,000 BC. The Copper Age people of the Cucuteni-Trypillian Culture resided in the western part, and the Sredny Stog Culture further east, succeeded by the early Bronze Age Yamna ("Kurgan") culture of the Pontic steppes, and by the Catacomb culture in the 3rd millennium BC.

== Iron Age and classical antiquity ==
=== Scythian settlement, Greek colonization, and Roman domination ===
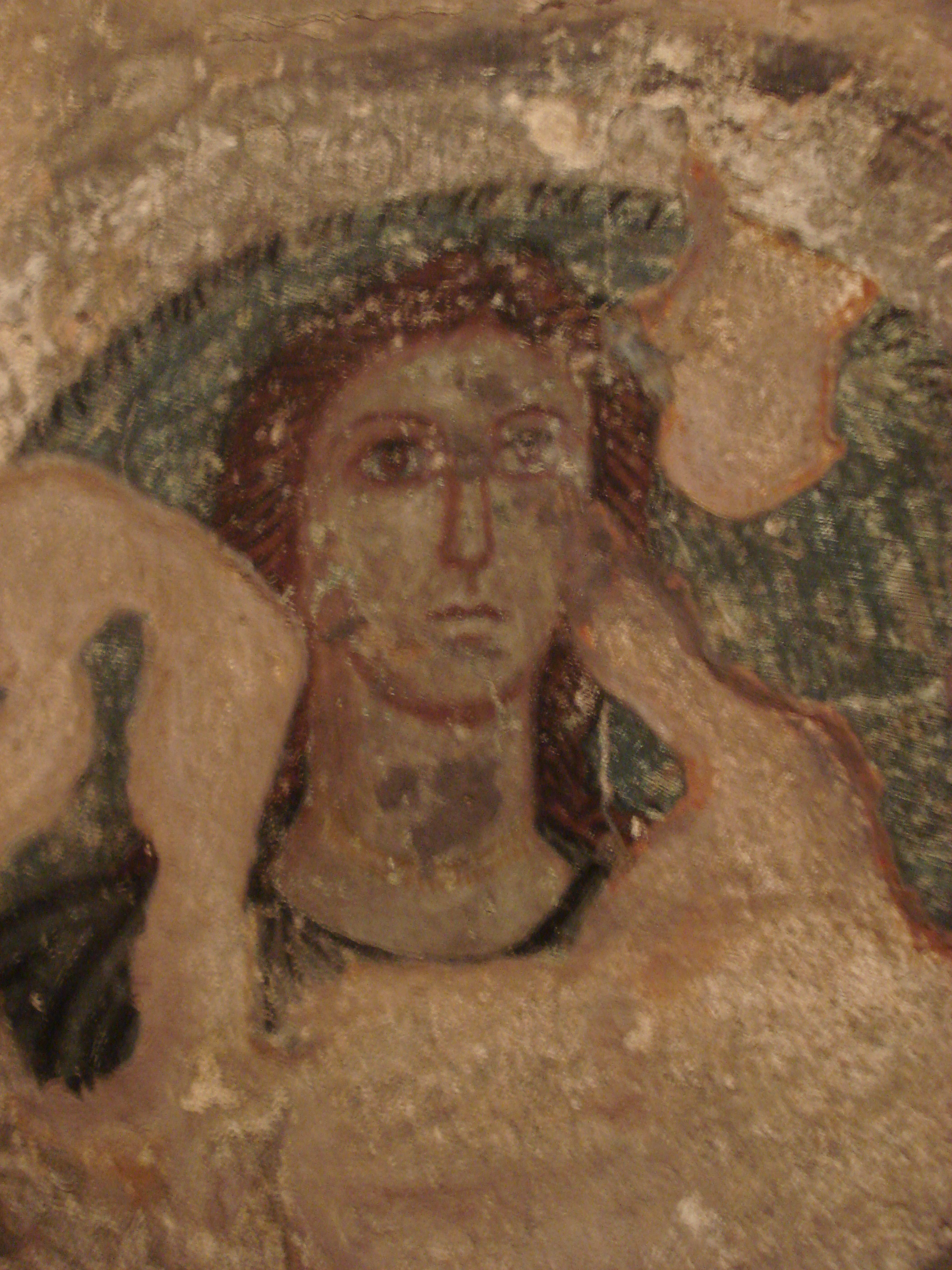
The goddess Demeter in a Greek fresco from Panticapaeum in the Bosporan Kingdom (a client state of Rome), 1st century AD, Crimea

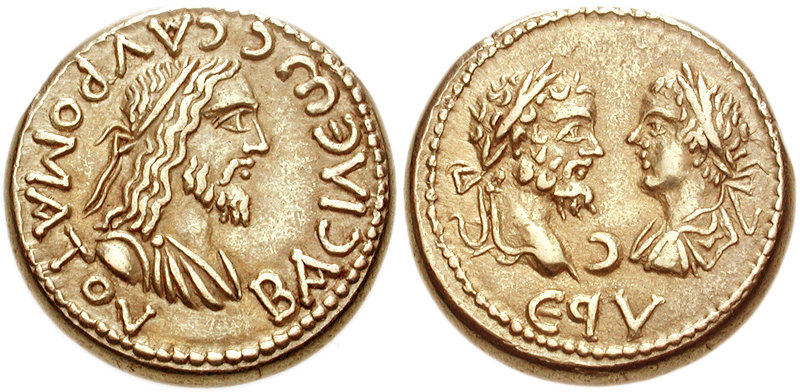
A gold stater of Bosporan king Tiberius Julius Sauromates II, his bust depicted on the obverse with the Greek legend "ΒΑϹΙΛΕΩϹ CΑΥΡΟΜΑΤΟΥ", and on the reverse the heads of Roman emperors Septimius Severus and Caracalla, dated 198 or 199 AD

During the Iron Age, these peoples were followed by the Dacians as well as nomadic peoples like the Cimmerians (archaeological Novocherkassk culture), Scythians and Sarmatians. The Scythian kingdom existed here from 750 to 250 BC. In the Scythian campaign of Darius the Great in 513 BC, the Achaemenid Persian army subjugated several Thracian peoples, and virtually all other regions along the European part of the Black Sea, such as parts of nowadays Bulgaria, Romania, Ukraine, and Russia, before it returned to Asia Minor. Greeks colonized Crimea and other coastal areas of Ukraine in the 7th or 6th century BC during the Archaic period. The culturally Greek Bosporan Kingdom thrived until it was invaded and occupied by the Goths and Huns in the 4th century AD. From 62 to 68 AD the Roman Empire briefly annexed the kingdom under Emperor Nero when he deposed the Bosporan king Tiberius Julius Cotys I. Afterwards the Bosporan Kingdom was made into a Roman client state with a Roman military presence during the middle of the 1st century AD.

=== Arrival of the Goths and Huns ===
In the 3rd century AD, the Goths migrated into the lands of modern Ukraine around 250–375 AD, which they called Oium, corresponding to the archaeological Chernyakhov culture. The Ostrogoths stayed in the area but came under the sway of the Huns from the 370s. North of the Ostrogothic kingdom was the Kyiv culture, flourishing from the 2nd–5th centuries, when it was also overrun by the Huns. After they helped defeat the Huns at the battle of Nedao in 454, the Ostrogoths were allowed by the Romans to settle in Pannonia. Along with other ancient Greek colonies founded in the 6th century BC on the northeastern shore of the Black Sea, the colonies of Tyras, Olbia, and Hermonassa continued as Roman and Byzantine (Eastern Roman) cities until the 6th century AD. Gothic influence waned by the end of the 5th century AD, when the Eastern Roman Empire reaffirmed its control and influence over the region. The Hunnic king Gordas ruled the Bosporan kingdom in the early 6th century AD and maintained good relations with Eastern Roman emperor Justinian I, but the latter invaded and occupied the country once Gordas was killed in a revolt in 527 AD. As late as the 12th century AD the Eastern Roman emperors claimed dominion over the territory of Cimmerian Bosporos.

=== Early Slavs ===
With the power vacuum created with the end of Hunnic and Gothic rule, Early Slavs, in the aftermath of the Kyiv culture, began to expand over much of the territory that is now Ukraine during the 5th century, and beyond to the Balkans from the 6th century. Although the origins of the Early Slavs are not known for certain, many theories suggest they may have originated near Polesia.

In the 5th and 6th centuries, the Antes Union (a tribal federation) is generally regarded to have been located in the territory of what is now Ukraine. The Antes were the ancestors of Ukrainians: White Croats, Severians, Polans, Drevlyans, Dulebes, Ulichians, and Tiverians. Migrations from Ukraine throughout the Balkans established many South Slavic nations. Northern migrations, reaching almost to Lake Ilmen, led to the emergence of the Ilmen Slavs, Krivichs, and Radimichs, the groups ancestral to the Russians. After a Pannonian Avar raid in 602 and the collapse of the Antes Union, most of these peoples survived as separate tribes until the beginning of the second millennium.

== Middle Ages ==
=== Early Middle Ages ===
In the 7th century, the territory of modern Ukraine was the core of the state of the Bulgars (often referred to as Old Great Bulgaria) with its capital city of Phanagoria. At the end of the 7th century, most Bulgar tribes migrated in several directions and the remains of their state were absorbed by the Khazars, a semi-nomadic people from Central Asia.

The Khazars founded the Khazar kingdom near the Caspian Sea and the Caucasus. The kingdom included western Kazakhstan and parts of Crimea, eastern Ukraine, southern Russia and Azerbaijan. The Khazars dominated enough of the Pontic–Caspian steppe such that there was a Pax Khazarica in terms of trade, which allowed long distance trade to occur in safety, including groups like the Radhanite Jews who traded as far as China to Tabriz, as well as the trade networks that surrounded Volga Bulgaria. This attracted other traders such as the Vikings in the Viking Age who would found Kievan Rus'.

=== Kievan Rus' ===
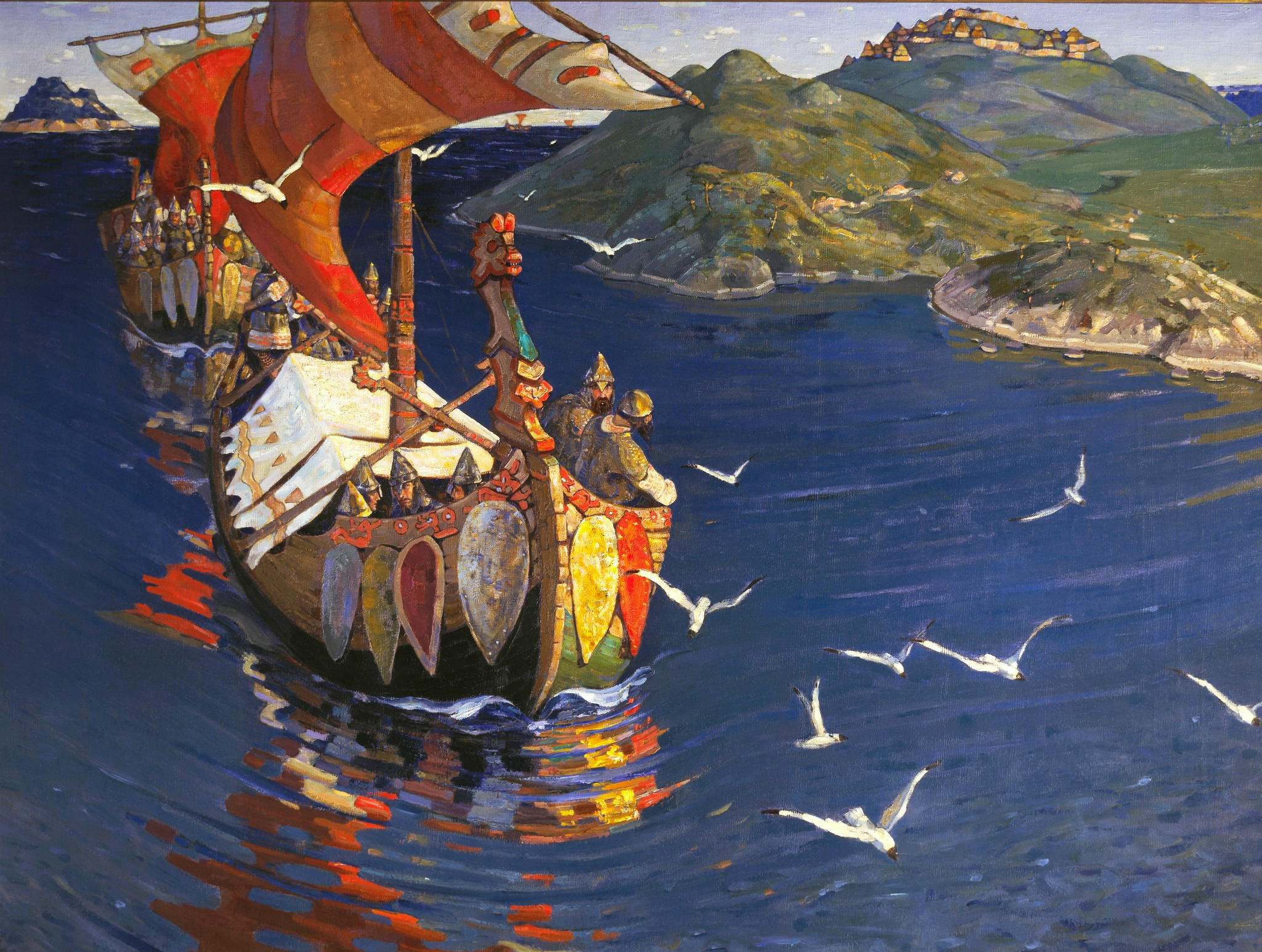
Overseas Guests by Nicholas Roerich, 1901

It is uncertain how the state of Kievan Rus' came to be, but the Varangian nobleman Oleh the Wise is generally credited with having established a principality at the city of Kyiv somewhere around the year 880. (Note: 'Regardless of the uncertainties surrounding the origin of Rus', with Helgi/Oleh (reigned 878–912) we have a known historical figure credited with building the foundations of a Kievan state. (...) With Oleh's invasion of Kiev and the assassination of Askol'd and Dir in 882, the consolidation of the East Slavic and Finnic tribes under the authority of the Varangian Rus' had begun.') Kyiv had already been established, but its origins are nebulous as well. According to archaeologists and historians such as Petro Tolochko (2007), Slavic settlement existed from the end of the 5th century in the area that later developed into the city. Kyiv may have paid tribute to the Khazars before Oleh conquered it. Tolochko and other scholars also theorise that 'Kyiv was not the center of any particular tribe but the intertribal center of a vast realm'; critical analysis of the Primary Chronicle, De Administrando Imperio and other sources suggests it may have been a cosmopolitan urban home to Slavic and non-Slavic groups, such as Scandinavian Varangians and Finno-Ugric peoples. Slavic peoples that were reportedly native to Ukraine included Polans (or Polianians), Drevlyans, Severians, Ulichs, Tiverians, White Croats and Dulebes, but their precise identity and interrelationships are difficult to establish and verify, as the sources are vague, contradictory and at times inaccurate.

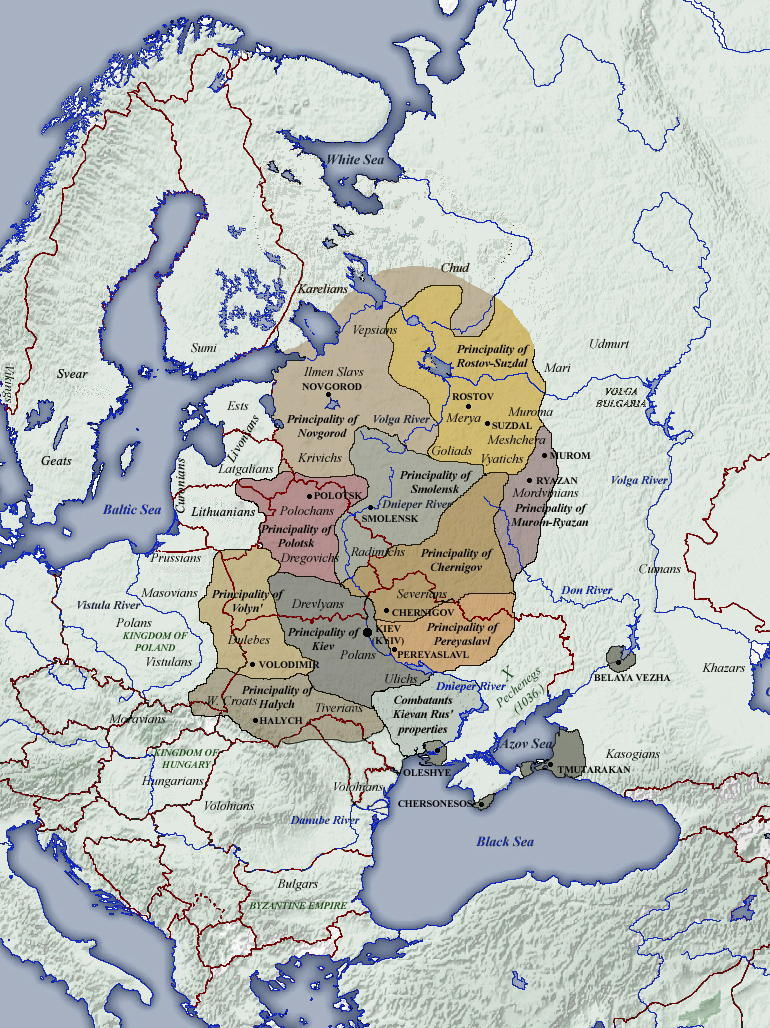
Kievan Rus' at its height

In the 10th and 11th century, Kyiv became one of the richest commercial centres of Europe, and the Kievan Rus' empire around it steadily expanded. Initially a benefactor of the worship of Slavic deities such as Perun, Volodimer I converted to Orthodox Christianity in the 980s, tying the realm into a political and ecclesiastical alliance with the Byzantine Empire. The reign of Yaroslav the Wise (r. 1019–1054) is generally regarded its zenith; Kievan Rus' was the most prosperous and powerful empire within Christendom. Kievan Rus' was never a fully centralized state, but rather a loose aggregation of principalities ruled by members of the Rurik dynasty. In the Late Middle Ages, it became known in the rest of Europe as Ruthenia (the Latin name for Rus'), especially for western principalities of Rus' after the Mongol invasion.

=== Christianisation ===
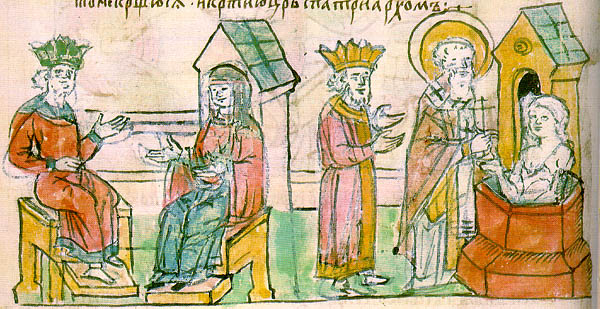
The baptism of Princess Olha in Constantinople. A miniature from the Radziwiłł Chronicle.

While Christianity had made headway into the territory of modern Ukraine before the first ecumenical council, the Council of Nicaea (325) (particularly along the Black Sea coast, with the clearest evidence being the Christianization of the Crimean Goths) and, in western Ukraine during the time of the Empire of Great Moravia, the formal governmental acceptance of Christianity in Rus' occurred in 988. The major promoter of the Christianization of Kievan Rus' was the Grand-Duke Vladimir the Great whose grandmother, Princess Olga, was a Christian. Later the Kyivan ruler, Yaroslav I promulgated the Russkaya Pravda (Truth of Rus') which continued through the Lithuanian period of Rus'.

In 1322, Pope John XXII established a diocese in Caffa (modern day Feodosia), which broke apart the Diocese of Khanbaliq (modern day Beijing), the only Catholic presence in the Mongol lands. For a few centuries it was the main see over an area from the Balkans to Sarai.

=== Disintegration of Kievan Rus' and Mongol invasion ===
Conflict among the various principalities of Rus', in spite of the efforts of Grand Prince Vladimir Monomakh, led to decline, beginning in the 12th century. In Rus' propria, the Kyiv region, the nascent Rus' principalities of Halych and Volhynia extended their rule. In the north, the name of Moscow appeared in the historical record in the Principality of Suzdal, which gave rise to the nation of Russia. In the north-west, the Principality of Polotsk increasingly asserted the autonomy of Belarus. Kyiv was sacked by the Principality of Vladimir (1169) in the power struggle between princes and later by Cuman and Mongol raiders in the 12th and 13th centuries, respectively. Subsequently, all principalities of present-day Ukraine acknowledged dependence upon the Mongols (1239–1240). In 1240, the Mongols sacked Kyiv.

=== Galicia-Volhynia ===
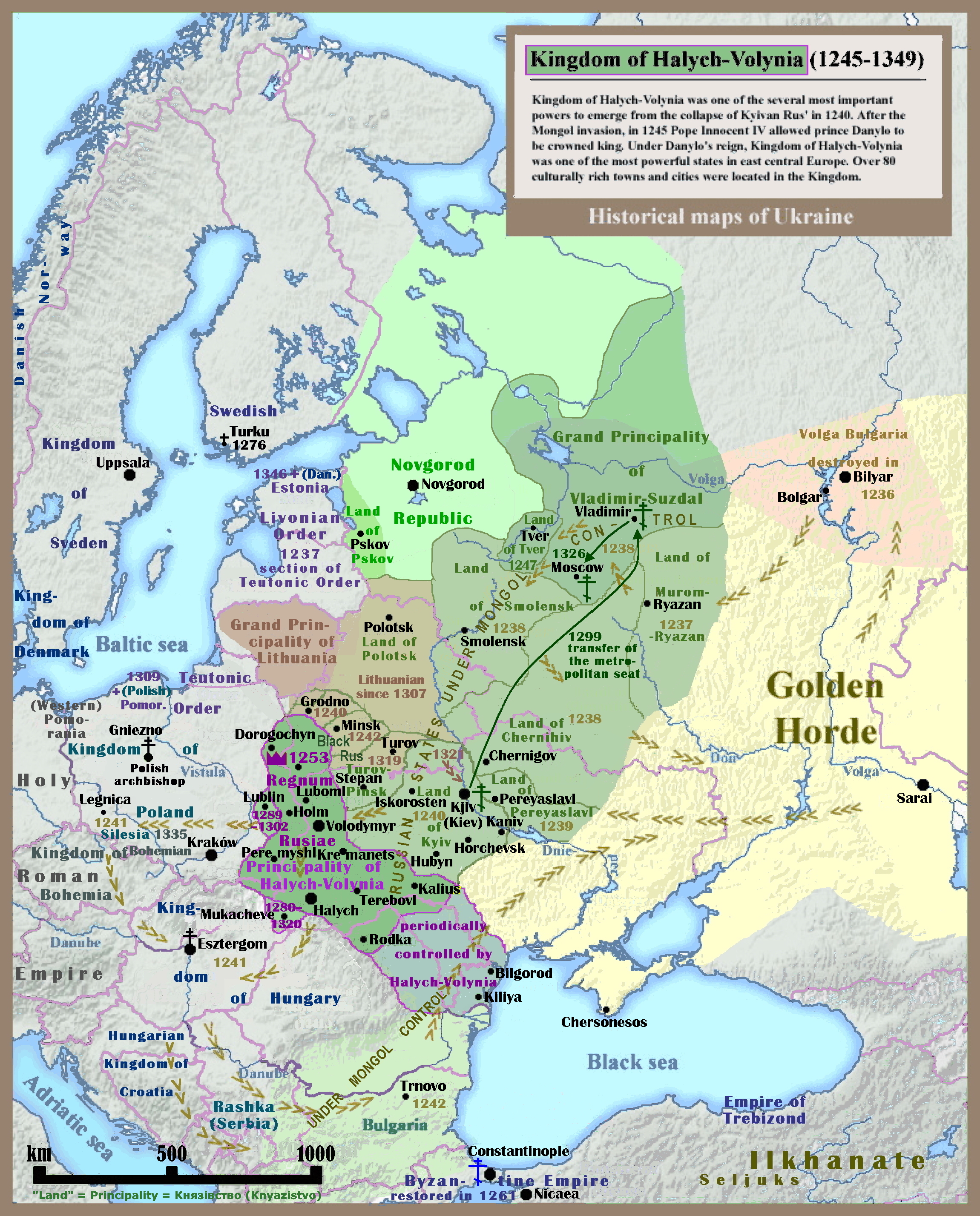
The Galician–Volhynian Kingdom in the 13th–14th centuries

A successor state to the Kievan Rus' on part of the territory of today's Ukraine was the Principality of Galicia-Volhynia. Previously, Vladimir the Great had established the cities of Halych and Volodymyr as regional capitals. The region was inhabited by the Dulebe, Tiverian and White Croat tribes. Initially both Volhynia and Galicia were separate principalities, ruled by descendants of Yaroslav the Wise (Galicia by Rostislavich dynasty, and Volhynia initially by Igorevich and eventually by Iziaslavich dynasty). During the rule Yaroslav Osmomysl (1153-1187) Galicia extended to the Black Sea. Rulers of both principalites were trying to extend the rule over another. It was finally achieved by Roman the Great (1197-1205), who not only united both Galicia and Volhynia, but also extended his rule to Kyiv for a short period of time.

His death was followed by a period of turmoil that lasted until his son Daniel regained the throne in 1238. Daniel managed to rebuild his father's state, including Kyiv. Daniel paid tribute to the Mongol khan, who appointed him baskak, responsible for collecting tribute from the Rus princes. In 1253 he was crowned by a papal delegation "King of Rus'" (Latin: rex Russiae); previously, the rulers of Rus' were termed "Grand Dukes" or "Princes."

=== Late Middle Ages ===
From the 13th century, the many parts of the coast of present-day Ukraine were dominated by the Republic of Genoa, which created numerous colonies around the Black Sea, most of them situated in today's Odesa Oblast. The Genoese colonies were well fortified, and there were garrisons in the fortresses and were used by the Genoese republic mainly for the purpose of dominating trade in the Black Sea. Genoa's dominance in the region would last until the 15th century.

During the 14th century, Poland and Lithuania fought wars against the Mongol invaders, and eventually most of Ukraine passed to the rule of Poland and Lithuania. More particularly, Red Ruthenia, and part of Volhynia and Podolia became part of Poland. King of Poland adopted the tile of "lord and heir of Ruthenia" (Latin: Russiae dominus et Heres). Lithuania took control of Polotsk, Volhynia, Chernihiv, and Kyiv following Battle of Blue Waters (1362/63), and the rulers of Lithuania then adopted the title of ruler of Rus'.

After the downfall of Kyivan Rus' and Galicia–Volhynia, their political, cultural and religious life continued under Lithuanian control. Ruthenian aristocrats, for example, the Olelkovich, joined the governing class of the Grand Duchy of Lithuania as members of the grand duke's privy council, senior military leaders, and administrators. Despite Lithuanian being the native language of the ruling class, the main written languages within the Grand Duchy of Lithuania were Latin, Old Church Slavonic, as well as Ruthenian, with East Slavonic Chancery being replaced by Polish in the early modern period.

Eventually, Poland took control of the southwestern region. Following the union between Poland and Lithuania, Poles, Germans, Lithuanians and Jews migrated to the region, forcing Ukrainians out of positions of power they shared with Lithuanians, with more Ukrainians being forced into Central Ukraine as a result of Polish migration, polonization, and other forms of oppression against Ukraine and Ukrainians, all of which started to fully take form.

In 1490, due to increased oppression of Ukrainians at the hands of the Polish, a series of successful rebellions was led by Ukrainian Petro Mukha, joined by other Ukrainians, such as early Cossacks and Hutsuls, in addition to Moldavians (Romanians). Known as Mukha's Rebellion, this series of battles was supported by the Moldavian prince Stephen the Great, and it is one of the earliest known uprisings of Ukrainians against Polish oppression. These rebellions saw the capture of several cities of Pokuttya, and reached as far west as Lviv, but without capturing the latter.

The 15th-century decline of the Golden Horde enabled the foundation of the Crimean Khanate, which occupied present-day Black Sea shores and southern steppes of Ukraine. Until the late 18th century, the Crimean Khanate maintained a massive slave trade with the Ottoman Empire and the Middle East, exporting about 2 million slaves from Russia and Ukraine over the period 1500–1700. It remained a vassal state of the Ottoman Empire until 1774, when it was finally dissolved by the Russian Empire in 1783.

== Early modern period ==
=== Polish–Lithuanian Commonwealth ===
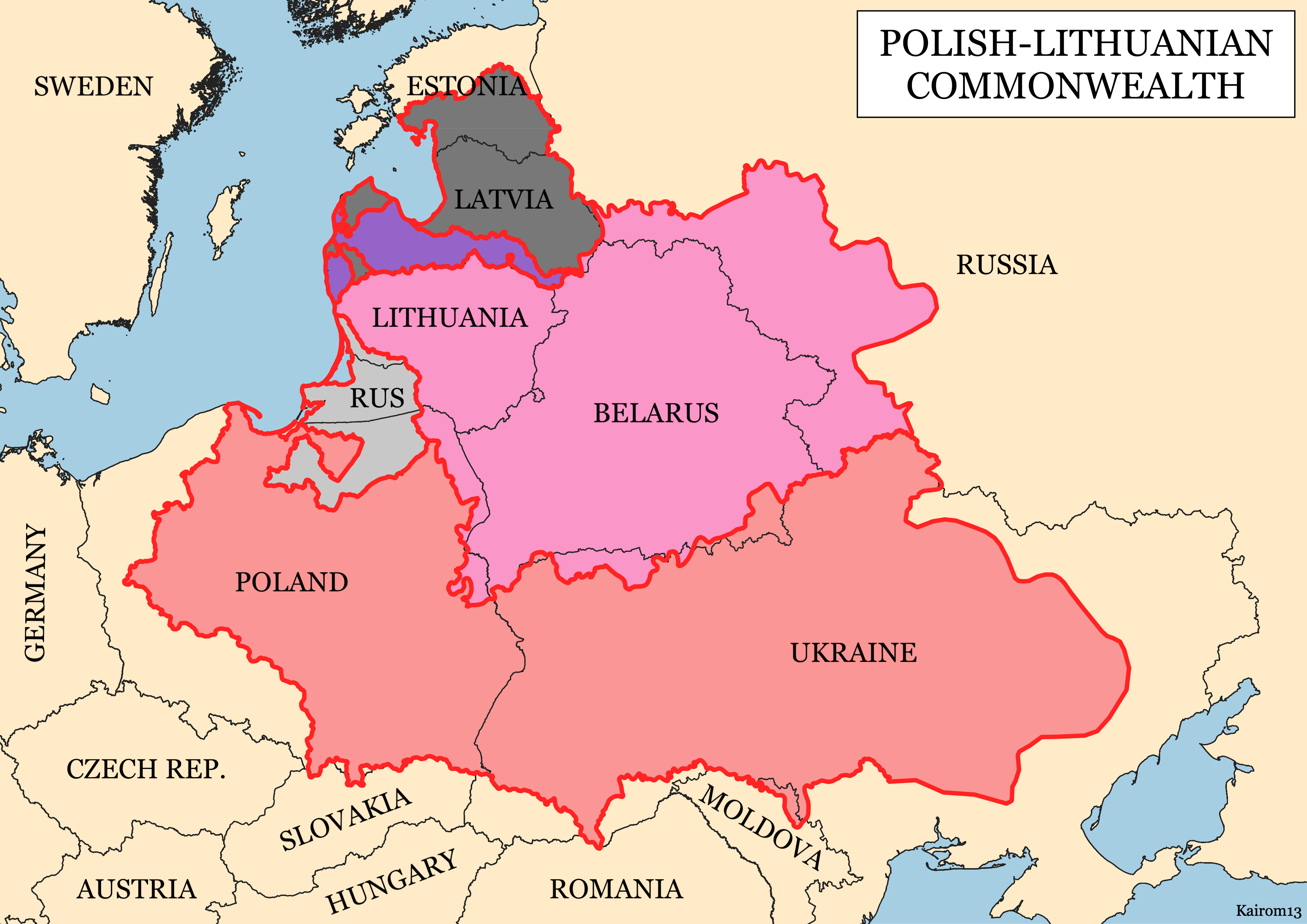
Polish–Lithuanian Commonwealth. Kingdom of Poland

After the Union of Lublin in 1569 and the formation of the Polish–Lithuanian Commonwealth Ukraine fell under the Polish administration, becoming part of the Crown of the Kingdom of Poland. The period immediately following the creation of the Commonwealth saw a huge revitalisation in colonisation efforts. Many new cities and villages were founded & links between different Ukrainian regions, such as Halych Land and Volhynia were greatly extended.

New schools spread the ideas of the Renaissance; Polish peasants arrived in great numbers and quickly became mixed with the local population; during this time, most Ukrainian nobles became Polonised and converted to Catholicism, and while most Ruthenian-speaking peasants remained within the Eastern Orthodox Church, social tension rose. Some of the Polonised nobility would heavily shape Polish culture, for example, Stanisław Orzechowski.

Ruthenian peasants who fled efforts to force them into serfdom came to be known as Cossacks and earned a reputation for their fierce martial spirit. Some Cossacks were enlisted by the Commonwealth as soldiers to protect the southeastern borders of Commonwealth from Tatars or took part in campaigns abroad (like Petro Konashevych-Sahaidachny in the battle of Khotyn 1621). Cossack units were also active in wars between the Polish–Lithuanian Commonwealth and Tsardom of Russia. Despite the Cossack's military usefulness, the Commonwealth, dominated by its nobility, refused to grant them any significant autonomy, instead attempting to turn most of the Cossack population into serfs. This led to an increasing number of Cossack rebellions aimed at the Commonwealth.

Size and population of the voidoveships in the 16th century
Voivodeship		Square kilometers	Population (est.)
Galicia		45,000	446,000
Volhynia		42,000	294,000
Podilia		19,000	98,000
Bratslav		35,000	311,000
Kyiv		117,000	234,000
Belz (two regions)	Kholm	19,000	133,000
Belz (two regions)	Pidliassia	10,000	233,000

=== Cossack era ===
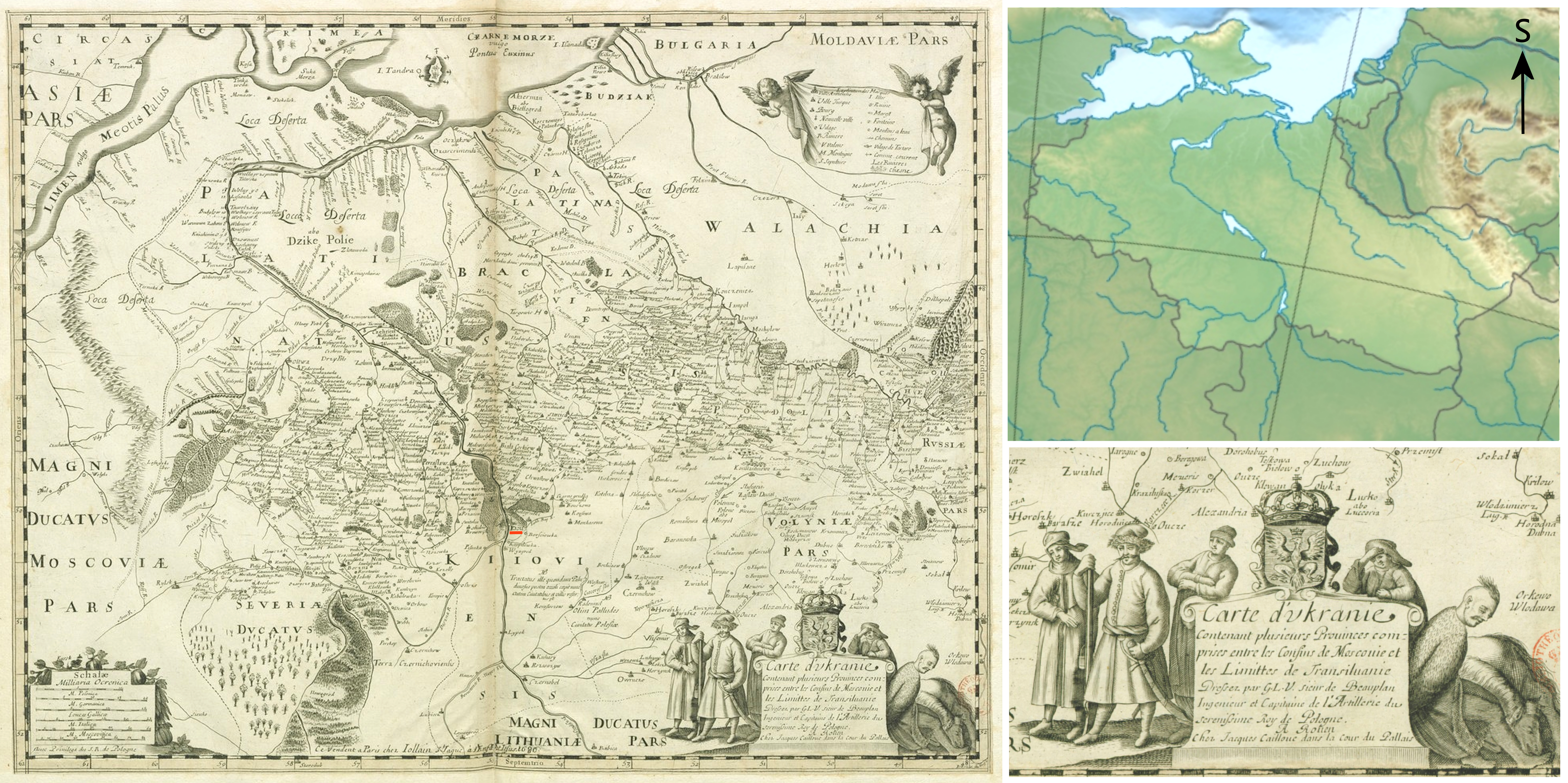
French map of Ukraine ("Carte d'Ukranie"), by Beauplan (1600-1673), cartographer. (South at the top)

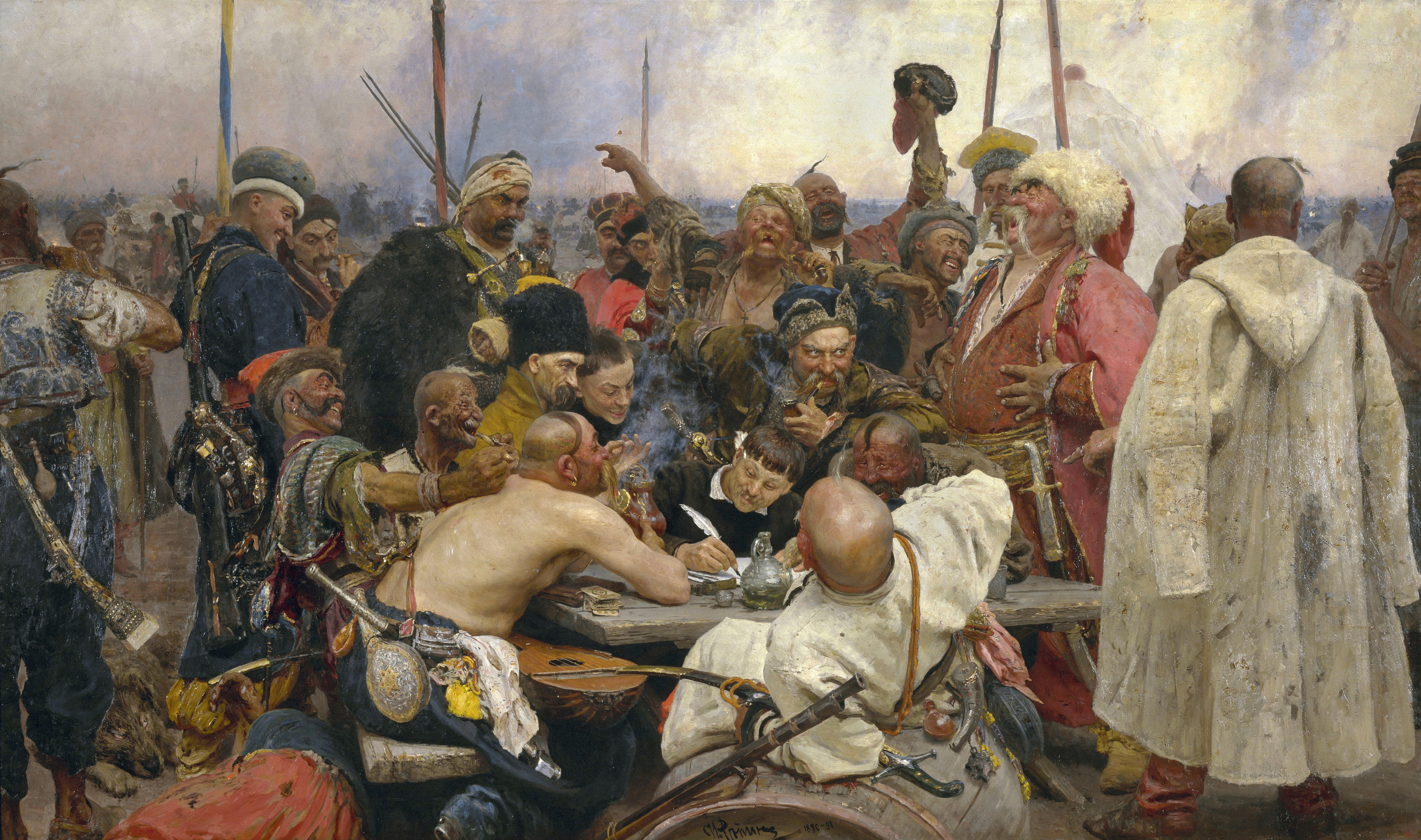
Zaporozhian Cossacks

The 1648 Ukrainian Cossack (Kozak) rebellion or Khmelnytsky Uprising, which started an era known as the Ruin (in Polish history as the Deluge), undermined the foundations and stability of the Commonwealth. The nascent Cossack state, the Cossack Hetmanate, usually viewed as precursor of Ukraine, found itself in a three-sided military and diplomatic rivalry with the Ottoman Turks, who controlled the Tatars to the south, the Commonwealth of Poland and Lithuania, and the Tsardom of Russia to the East.

The Zaporozhian Host, in order to leave the Polish–Lithuanian Commonwealth, sought a treaty of protection with Russia in 1654. This agreement was known as the Pereiaslav Agreement. Commonwealth authorities then sought compromise with the Ukrainian Cossack state by signing the Treaty of Hadiach in 1658, but—after thirteen years of incessant warfare—the agreement was later superseded by the 1667 Polish–Russian Truce of Andrusovo, which divided Ukrainian territory between the Commonwealth and Russia. Under Russia, the Cossacks initially retained official autonomy in the Hetmanate. For a time, they also maintained a semi-independent republic in Zaporizhzhia and a colony on the Russian frontier in Sloboda Ukraine.

In 1686, the Metropolitanate of Kyiv was annexed by the Moscow Patriarchate through the Synodal Letter of the Ecumenical Patriarch of Constantinople Dionysius IV.

=== Russian Empire and Austria-Hungary ===
During subsequent decades, Tsarist rule over central Ukraine gradually replaced 'protection'. Sporadic Cossack uprisings were now aimed at the Russian authorities, but eventually petered out by the late 18th century, following the destruction of entire Cossack hosts. After the Partitions of Poland in 1772, 1793 and 1795, the extreme west of Ukraine fell under the control of the Austrians, with the rest becoming a part of the Russian Empire. As a result of the Russo-Turkish Wars, the Ottoman Empire's control receded from south-central Ukraine, while the rule of Hungary over the Transcarpathian region continued. Ukrainian writers and intellectuals were inspired by the nationalistic spirit stirring other European peoples existing under other imperial governments and became determined to revive the Ukrainian linguistic and cultural traditions and re-establish a Ukrainian nation-state, a movement that became known as Ukrainophilism.

The Russophile policies of Russification and Panslavism led to an exodus of a number of Ukrainian intellectuals into Western Ukraine. However, many Ukrainians accepted their fate in the Russian Empire and some were able to achieve great success there.

The fate of the Ukrainians was far different under the Austrian Empire where they found themselves in the pawn position of the Russian–Austrian power struggle for Central and Southern Europe. Unlike in Russia, most of the elite that ruled Galicia were of Austrian or Polish descent, with the Ruthenians being almost exclusively kept in peasantry. During the 19th century, Russophilia was a common occurrence among the Slavic population, but the mass exodus of Ukrainian intellectuals escaping from Russian repression in Eastern Ukraine, as well as the intervention of Austrian authorities, caused the movement to be replaced by Ukrainophilia, which would then cross over into the Russian Empire. With the start of World War I, all those supporting Russia were rounded up by Austrian forces and held in a concentration camp at Talerhof where many died.

== Modern history ==
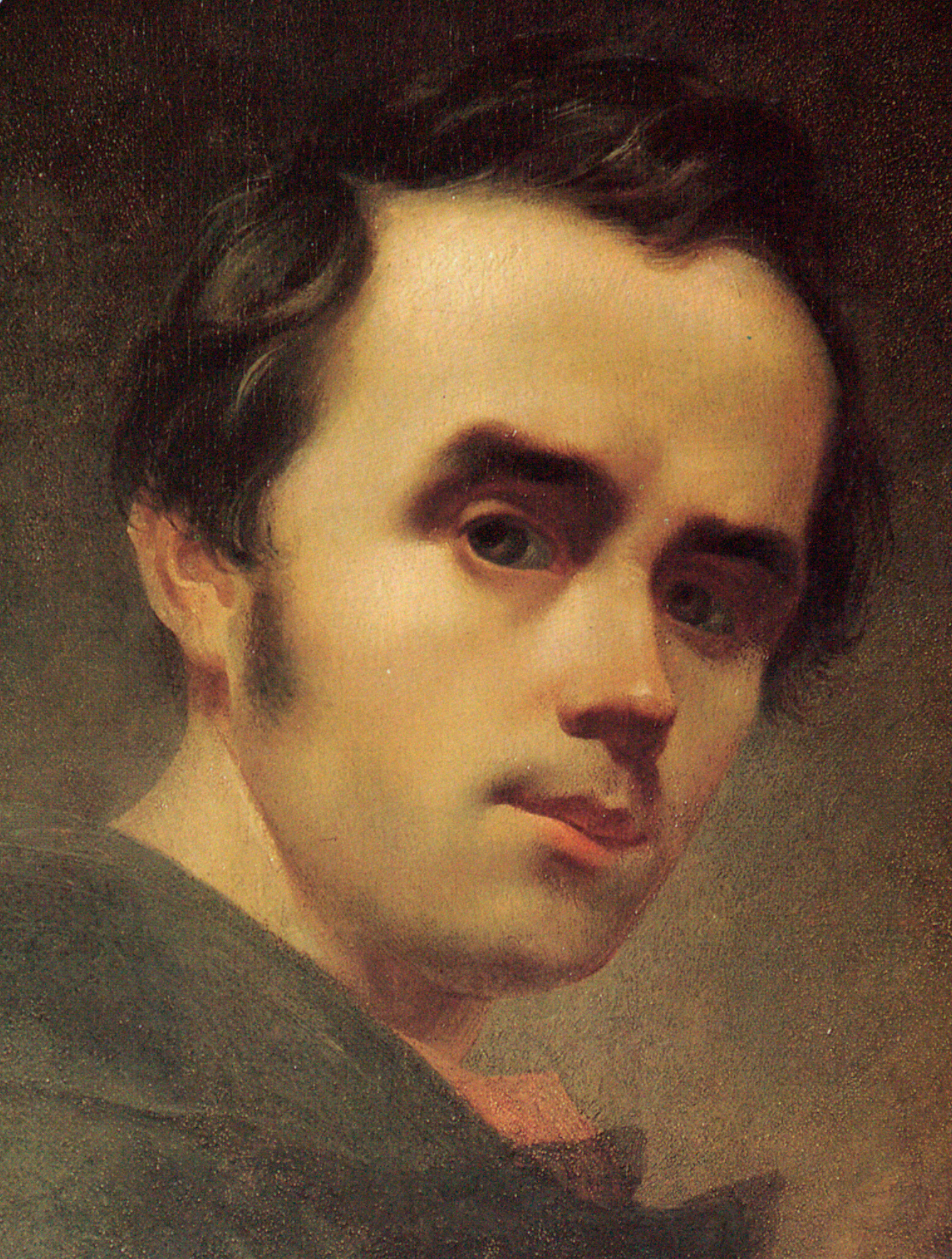
Taras Shevchenko self-portrait, 1840

=== 17th and 18th-century Ukraine ===
Ukrainian culture had great influence on the Russian tsardom after Ukraine's incorporation. At the end of the 17th century and the beginning of the 18th century, the "Ukrainian school" dominated Russian literature. Ukrainian-born clerics such as Theophan Prokopovich and Stefan Yavorsky, both alumni of the Kyiv-Mohyla Academy, played an important role in the church reform of Peter the Great and were among the first presidents of the Most Holy Synod. At the time when the empire was proclaimed in 1721, the ideologists of the autocracy and empire were often Ukrainians.

Ukraine emerges as the concept of a nation, and the Ukrainians as a nationality, with the Ukrainian National Revival in the mid-18th century, in the wake of the peasant revolt of 1768/1769 and the eventual partition of the Polish–Lithuanian Commonwealth. Galicia fell to the Austrian Empire, and the rest of Ukraine to the Russian Empire.

While right-bank Ukraine belonged to the Polish–Lithuanian Commonwealth until late 1793, left-bank Ukraine had been incorporated into Tsardom of Russia in 1667 (under the Treaty of Andrusovo). In 1672, Podolia was occupied by the Turkish Ottoman Empire, while Kyiv and Braclav came under the control of Hetman Petro Doroshenko until 1681, when they were also captured by the Turks, but in 1699 the Treaty of Karlowitz returned those lands to the Commonwealth.

Most of Ukraine fell to the Russian Empire under the reign of Catherine the Great; the Crimean Khanate was annexed by Russia in 1783, following the Emigration of Christians from Crimea in 1778, and in 1793 right-bank Ukraine was annexed by Russia in the Second Partition of Poland.

Ukrainian writers and intellectuals were inspired by the nationalistic spirit stirring other European peoples existing under other imperial governments. Russia, fearing separatism, imposed strict limits on attempts to elevate the Ukrainian language and culture, even banning its use and study. The Russophile policies of Russification and Panslavism led to an exodus of a number some Ukrainian intellectuals into Western Ukraine, while others embraced a Pan-Slavic or Russian identity.

=== 19th century ===
Ukraine under the reign of Alexander I (1801–1825) saw Russian presence only involving the imperial army and its bureaucracy, but by the reign of Nicholas I (1825–1855), Russia had by then established a centralized administration in Ukraine. After suppressing the November Uprising of 1830, the tsarist regime instituted Russification policies on the Right Bank.

The 2.4 million Ukrainians under the Habsburg Empire lived in eastern Galicia and consisted mainly of the peasantry (95%) with the remainder being priestly families. The Galician nobility were majoritively Poles or Polonized Ukrainians. Development here lagged behind Russian-ruled Ukraine and was one of the poorest regions in Europe. After the 1848 revolutions, Ukrainians living in the Austrian Empire established the Supreme Ruthenian Council, demanding autonomy, they also opened the first Ukrainian-language newspaper (Zoria halytska).

The rise in national consciousness arose in the 19th century, with representation of the intelligentsia declining among the nobles and increasing towards commoners and peasants, they saw a process of nation-building to improve national rights and social justice but was uncovered soon after by the Tsarist authorities. The 1861 emancipation of serfs in the Russian Empire greatly impacted Ukrainians as 42% of them were serfs.

Russia, fearing separatism, imposed strict limits on attempts to elevate the Ukrainian language and culture, even banning its use and study: in 1863, the Valuev Circular banned the use of Ukrainian in religious and educational literature, in 1876, the Ems Ukaz outlawed Ukrainian-language publications outright, as well as the import of texts published abroad in Ukrainian, the use of Ukrainian in theatrical productions and public readings, the use of Ukrainian in schools.. During the late 19th century, heavy taxes, rapid population growth and lack of land impoverished the peasantry. However the steppe regions managed to produce 20% of world production of wheat and 80% of the empire's sugar. Later, industrialization arrived with the first railway track constructed in 1866. Ukraine's economy by now was integrated into the imperial system and it saw much urban development.

=== 20th century ===
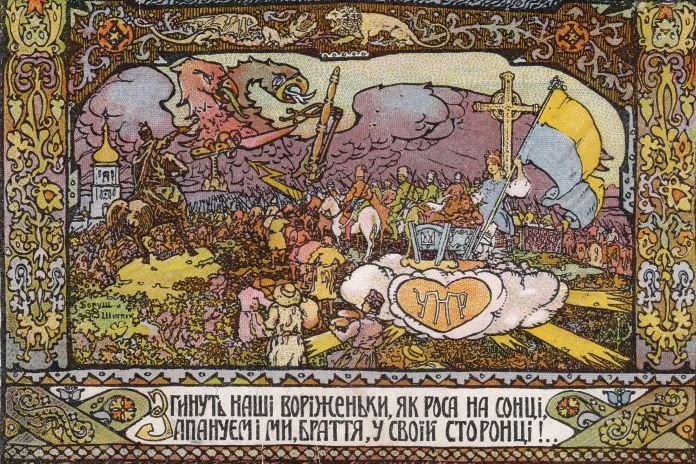
1917 Ukrainian People's Republic propaganda poster: Our enemies will vanish like dew in the sun; We too shall rule in our country.

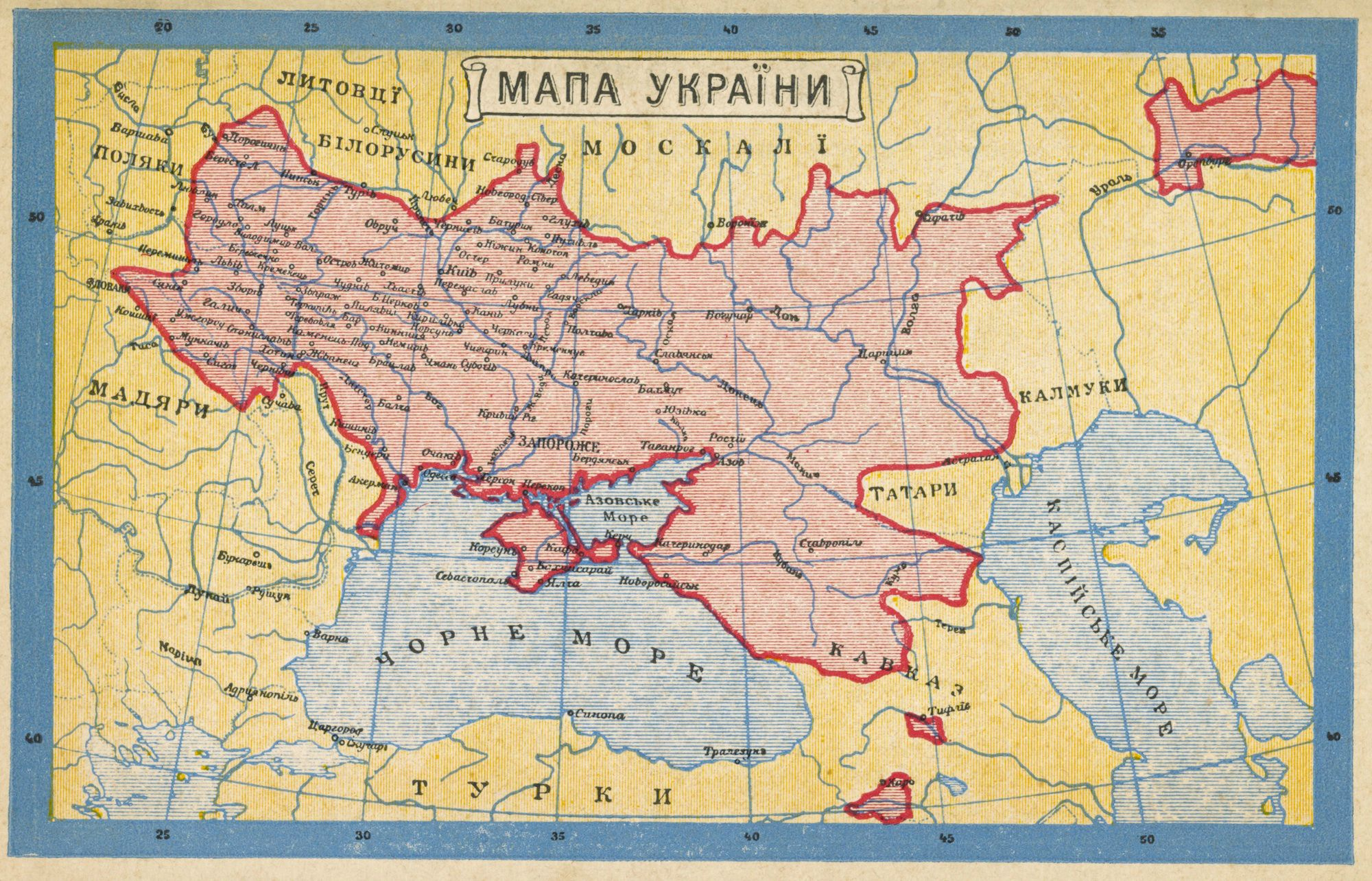
Ukraine in a 1919 postcard.

==== Russian Revolution and War of Independence ====
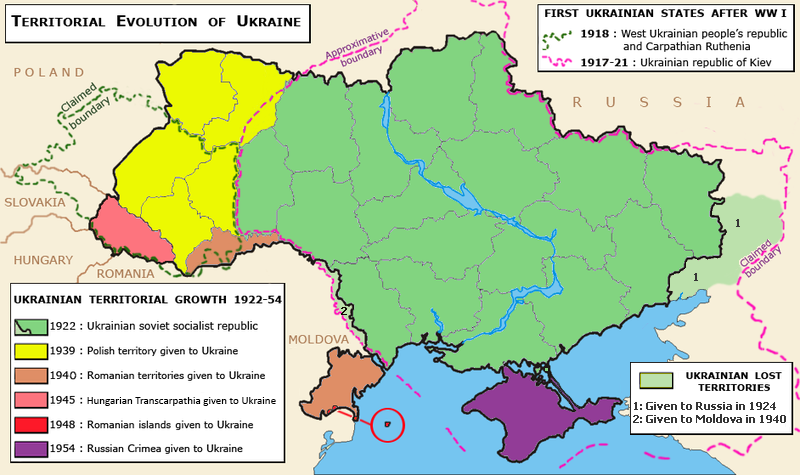
Territorial evolution of the Ukrainian SSR 1922–1954. Okrug Taganrog and Shakhty lost (1924); Polish Volhynia gained (1939); Transnistria lost (1940); Transcarpatia gained (1945); Romanian islands gained (1948); Crimea gained (1954).

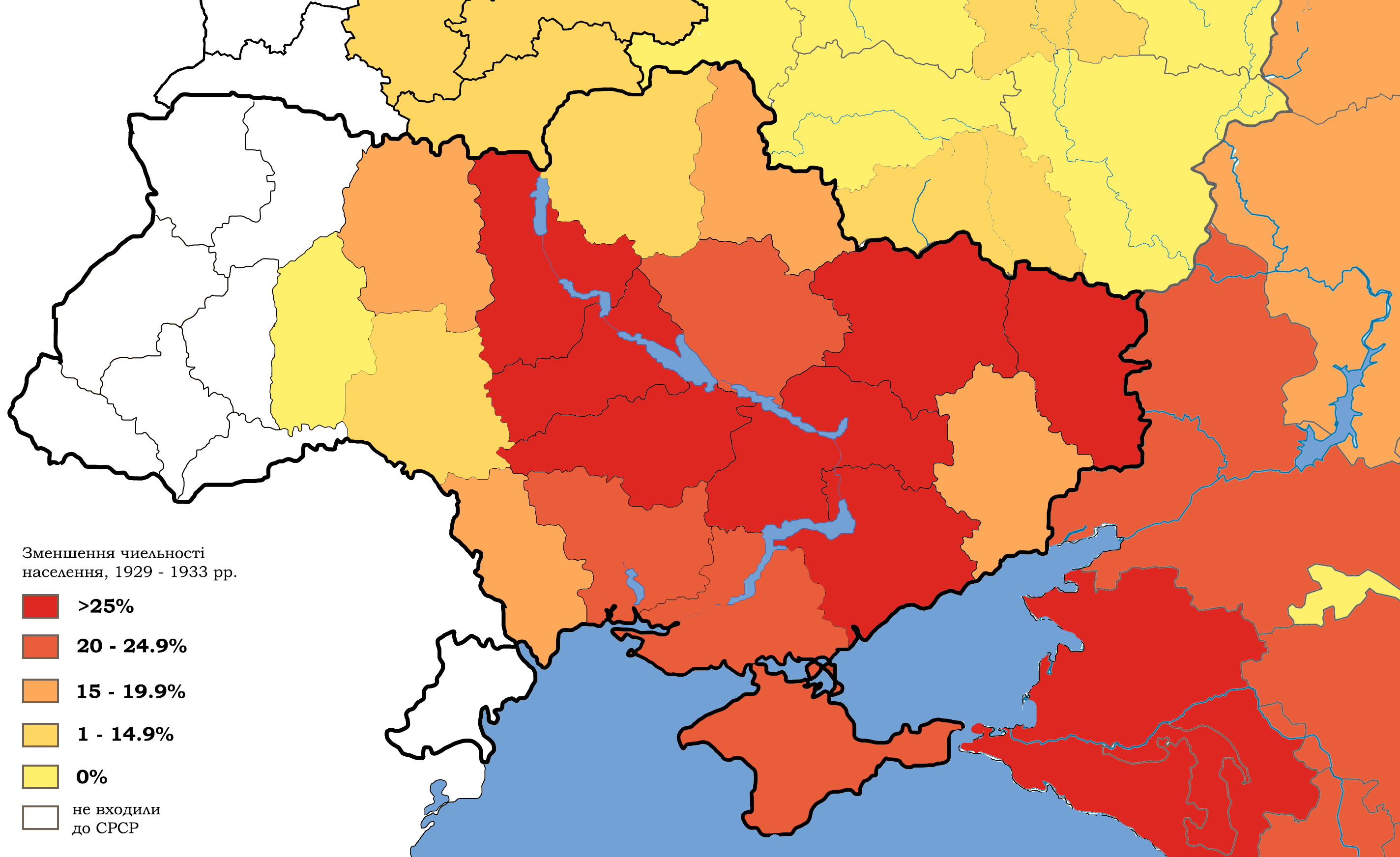
Depopulation in 1929–1933, including during the Holodomor

Historian Paul Kubicek says:

Between 1917 and 1920, several entities that aspired to be independent Ukrainian states came into existence. This period, however, was extremely chaotic, characterized by revolution, international and civil war, and lack of strong central authority. Many factions competed for power in the area that is today's Ukraine, and not all groups desired a separate Ukrainian state. Ultimately, Ukrainian independence was short-lived, as most Ukrainian lands were incorporated into the Soviet Union and the remainder, in western Ukraine, was divided among Poland, Czechoslovakia, and Romania.

Canadian scholar Orest Subtelny says:

In 1919 total chaos engulfed Ukraine. Indeed, in the modern history of Europe no country experienced such complete anarchy, bitter civil strife, and total collapse of authority as did Ukraine at this time. Six different armies-– those of the Ukrainians, the Bolsheviks, the Whites, the Entente [French], the Poles and the anarchists – operated on its territory. Kyiv changed hands five times in less than a year. Cities and regions were cut off from each other by the numerous fronts. Communications with the outside world broke down almost completely. The starving cities emptied as people moved into the countryside in their search for food.

The Ukrainian War of Independence of 1917 to 1921 produced the Makhnovshchina, Ukrainian People's Republic, Ukrainian Soviet Socialist Republic, and West Ukrainian People's Republic, among other short-lived states, which were mostly subsumed in the Soviet Union, although Western Ukraine ended up in Poland.

The Soviet famine of 1930–33, now known as the Holodomor, left millions dead in the Soviet Union, the majority of them Ukrainians not only in Ukraine but also in Kuban and former Don Cossack lands.

==== Second World War ====
The Second World War began in September 1939, when Hitler and Stalin invaded Poland, the Soviet Union taking most of Eastern Poland. Nazi Germany with its allies invaded the Soviet Union in 1941. Between 4.5 and 6 million Ukrainians fought in the Soviet Army against the Nazis. Some Ukrainians initially regarded the Wehrmacht soldiers as liberators from Soviet rule, while others formed a partisan movement. Some elements of the Ukrainian nationalist underground formed a Ukrainian Insurgent Army that fought both Soviet forces and the Nazis. Others collaborated with the Germans. The pro-Polish trend in the Ukrainian national movement, declaring loyalty to the Second Polish Republic and in return demanding autonomy for Ukrainians (e.g. Ukrainian National Democratic Alliance), became marginalized, mainly due to its rejection by the Polish side, where supporters of forced assimilation of Ukrainians into Polish culture dominated. Some 1.5 million Jews were murdered by the Nazis during their occupation. In Volhynia, Ukrainian fighters committed a massacre against up to 100,000 Polish civilians. Residual small groups of the UPA-partizans acted near the Polish and Soviet border as long as to the 1950s. Galicia, Volhynia, South Bessarabia, Northern Bukovina, and Carpathian Ruthenia that were annexed as a result of the Molotov–Ribbentrop Pact in 1939 were added to the Ukrainian SSR.

After World War II, some amendments to the Constitution of the Ukrainian SSR were accepted, which allowed it to act as a separate subject of international law in some cases and to a certain extent, remaining a part of the Soviet Union at the same time. In particular, these amendments allowed the Ukrainian SSR to become one of the founding members of the United Nations (UN) together with the Soviet Union and the Byelorussian SSR. This was part of a deal with the United States to ensure a degree of balance in the General Assembly, which, the USSR opined, was unbalanced in favor of the Western Bloc. In its capacity as a member of the UN, the Ukrainian SSR was an elected member of the United Nations Security Council in 1948–1949 and 1984–1985. The Crimean Oblast was transferred from the RSFSR to the Ukrainian SSR in 1954.

=== Independence ===
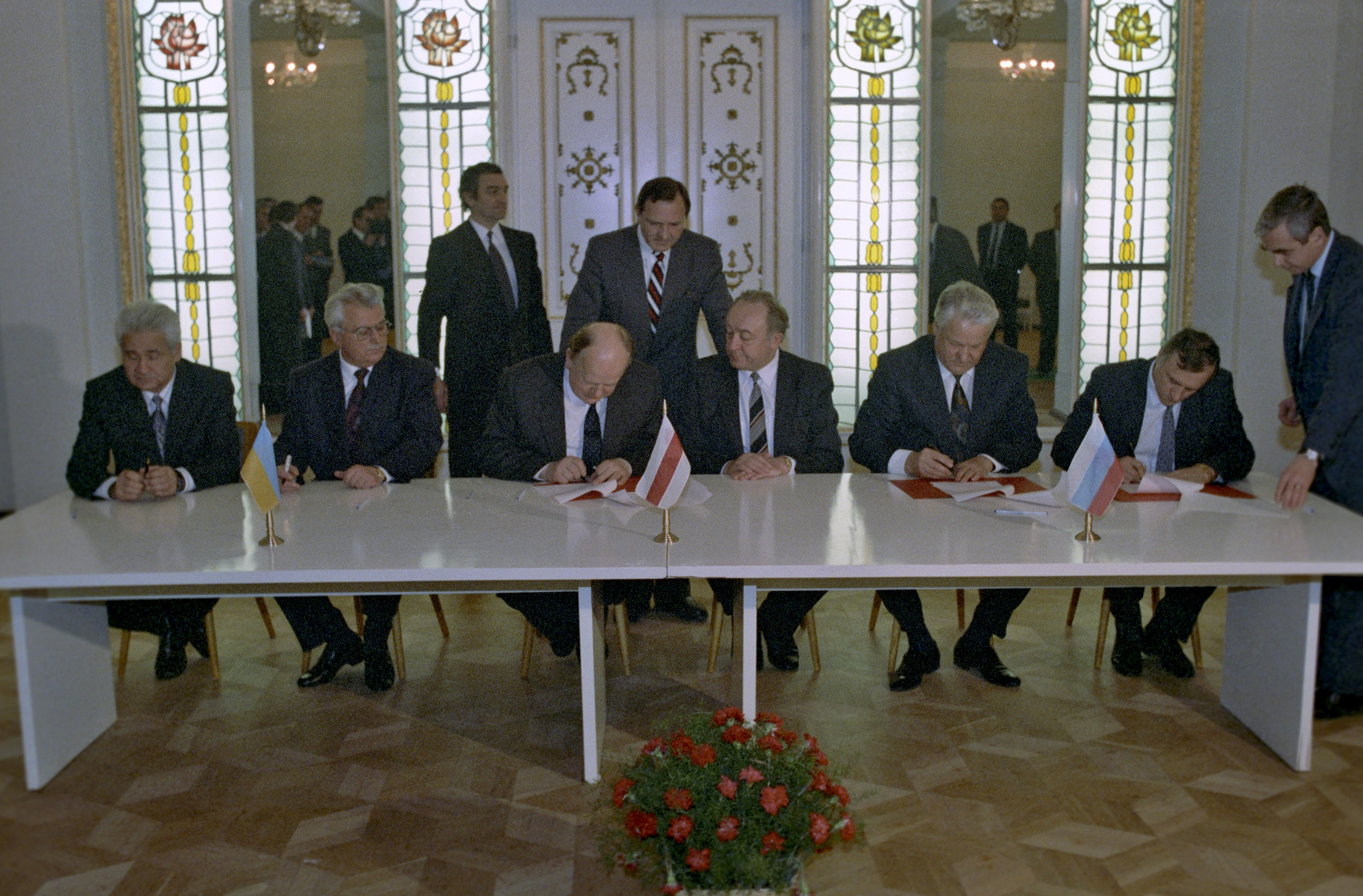
Ukrainian President Leonid Kravchuk and President of the Russian Federation Boris Yeltsin signed the Belavezha Accords, dissolving the Soviet Union, 8 December 1991

The coat of arms of Ukraine, adopted 19 February 1992, show the tryzub or "trident", a design proposed in 1917 by Mykhailo Hrushevskyi for the Ukrainian People's Republic, ultimately based on a symbol stamped on Kievan coins by Vladimir the Great.

The blue-and-yellow Flag of Ukraine was introduced on 28 January 1992, based on a flag used in the Ukrainian War of Independence in 1917/18.

With the collapse of the Soviet Union in 1991, Ukraine became an independent state, formalised with a referendum in December 1991. On 21 January 1990, over 300,000 Ukrainians organized a human chain for Ukrainian independence between Kyiv and Lviv. Ukraine officially declared itself an independent country on 24 August 1991, when the communist Supreme Soviet (parliament) of Ukraine proclaimed that Ukraine would no longer follow the laws of USSR and only the laws of the Ukrainian SSR, de facto declaring Ukraine's independence from the Soviet Union. On 1 December, voters approved a referendum formalizing independence from the Soviet Union. Over 90% of Ukrainian citizens voted for independence, with majorities in every region, including 56% in Crimea. The Soviet Union formally ceased to exist on 26 December, when the presidents of Ukraine, Belarus and Russia (the founding members of the USSR) met in Białowieża Forest to formally dissolve the Union in accordance with the Soviet Constitution. With this, Ukraine's independence was formalized de jure and recognized by the international community.

Also on 1 December 1991, Ukrainian voters in their first presidential election elected Leonid Kravchuk. During his presidency, the Ukrainian economy shrank by more than 10% per year (in 1994 by more than 20%). The presidency (1994–2005) of the 2nd President of Ukraine, Leonid Kuchma, was surrounded by numerous corruption scandals and the lessening of media freedoms, including the Cassette Scandal. During Kuchma's presidency, the economy recovered, with GDP growth at around 10% a year in his last years in office.

==== Orange Revolution and Euromaidan ====
In 2004, Kuchma announced that he would not run for re-election. Two major candidates emerged in the 2004 presidential election. Viktor Yanukovych, the incumbent Prime Minister, supported by both Kuchma and by the Russian Federation, wanted closer ties with Russia. The main opposition candidate, Viktor Yushchenko, called for Ukraine to turn its attention westward and aim to eventually join the EU. In the runoff election, Yanukovych officially won by a narrow margin, but Yushchenko and his supporters alleged that vote rigging and intimidation cost him many votes, especially in eastern Ukraine. A political crisis erupted after the opposition started massive street protests in Kyiv and other cities ("Orange Revolution"), and the Supreme Court of Ukraine ordered the election results null and void. A second runoff found Viktor Yushchenko the winner. Five days later, Yanukovych resigned from office and his cabinet was dismissed on 5 January 2005.

During the Yushchenko term, relations between Russia and Ukraine often appeared strained as Yushchenko looked towards improved relations with the European Union and less toward Russia. In 2005, a highly publicized dispute over natural gas prices with Russia caused shortages in many European countries that were reliant on Ukraine as a transit country. A compromise was reached in January 2006.

By the time of the presidential election of 2010, Yushchenko and Yulia Tymoshenko — allies during the Orange Revolution — had become bitter enemies. Tymoshenko ran for president against both Yushchenko and Viktor Yanukovych, creating a three-way race. Yushchenko, whose popularity had plummeted, persisted in running, and many pro-Orange voters stayed home. In the second round of the election, Yanukovych won the run-off ballot with 48% to Tymoshenko's 45%.

During his presidency (2010–2014), Yanukovych and his Party of Regions were accused of trying to create a "controlled democracy" in Ukraine and of trying to destroy the main opposition party Bloc Yulia Tymoshenko, but both have denied these charges. One frequently cited example of Yanukovych's attempts to centralise power was the 2011 sentencing of Yulia Tymoshenko, which has been condemned by Western governments as potentially being politically motivated.

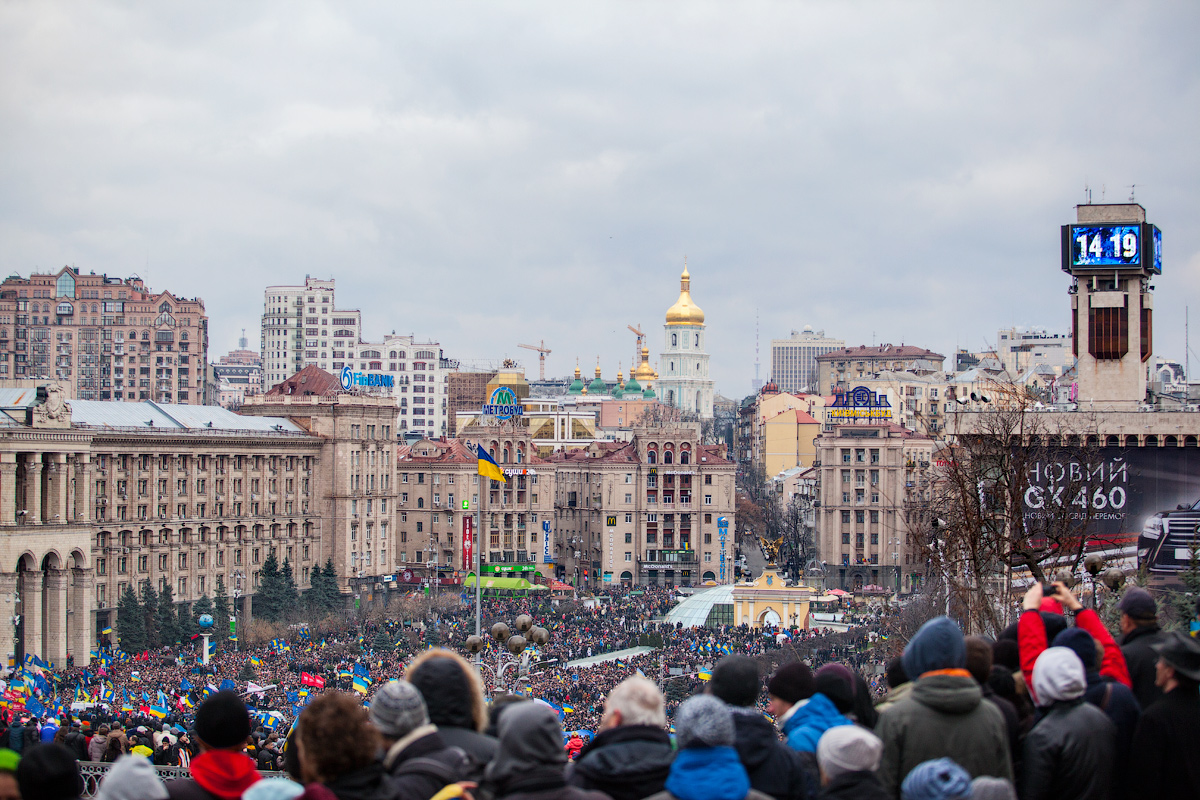
2014 Euromaidan protests in Kyiv

In November 2013, President Yanukovych did not sign the Ukraine–European Union Association Agreement and instead pursued closer ties with Russia. This move sparked protests on the streets of Kyiv and, ultimately, the Revolution of Dignity. Protesters set up camps in Kyiv's Maidan Nezalezhnosti (Independence Square), and in December 2013 and January 2014 protesters started taking over various government buildings, first in Kyiv, and later in Western Ukraine. Battles between protesters and police resulted in about 80 deaths in February 2014.

Following the violence, the Ukrainian parliament on 22 February voted to remove Yanukovych from power (on the grounds that his whereabouts were unknown and he thus could not fulfil his duties), and to free Yulia Tymoshenko from prison. On the same day, Yanukovych supporter Volodymyr Rybak resigned as speaker of the Parliament, and was replaced by Tymoshenko loyalist Oleksandr Turchynov, who was subsequently installed as interim President. Yanukovych had fled Kyiv, and subsequently gave a press conference in the Russian city of Rostov-on-Don.

==== Western Integration ====
On 1 January 2016, Ukraine joined the DCFTA with the EU. Ukrainian citizens were granted visa-free travel to the Schengen Area for up to 90 days during any 180-day period on 11 June 2017, and the Association Agreement formally came into effect on 1 September 2017. Significant achievements in the foreign policy arena include support for anti-Russian sanctions, obtaining a visa-free regime with the countries of the European Union, and better recognition of the need to overcome extremely difficult tasks within the country. However, the old local authorities did not want any changes; they were cleansed of anti-Maidan activists (lustration), but only in part. The fight against corruption was launched, but was limited to sentences of petty officials and electronic declarations, and the newly established NABU and NACP were marked by scandals in their work. Judicial reform was combined with the appointment of old, compromised judges. The investigation of crimes against Maidan residents was delayed. In order to counteract the massive global Russian anti-Ukrainian propaganda of the "information war", the Ministry of Information Policy was created, which for 5 years did not show effective work, except for the ban on Kaspersky Lab, Dr.Web, 1С, Mail.ru, Yandex and Russian social networks VKontakte or Odnoklassniki and propaganda media. In 2017, the president signed the law "On Education", which met with opposition from national minorities, and quarreled with the Government of Hungary. At the same time, the economic situation continued deterirating, mainly due to the widespread corruption. By 2018 Ukraine became the poorest country of Europe, with the GDP per capita below $3,000.

On May 19, 2018, Poroshenko signed a Decree which put into effect the decision of the National Security and Defense Council on the final termination of Ukraine's participation in the statutory bodies of the Commonwealth of Independent States. As of February 2019, Ukraine minimized its participation in the Commonwealth of Independent States to a critical minimum and effectively completed its withdrawal. The Verkhovna Rada of Ukraine did not ratify the accession, i.e. Ukraine has never been a member of the CIS.

On January 6, 2019, in Fener, a delegation of the Orthodox Church of Ukraine with the participation of President of Ukraine Petro Poroshenko received a Tomos on autocephaly. The Tomos was presented to the head of the OCU, Metropolitan Epiphanius, during a joint liturgy with the Ecumenical Patriarch. The next day, Tomos was brought to Ukraine for a demonstration at St. Sophia Cathedral. On January 9, all members of the Synod of the Constantinople Orthodox Church signed the Tomos during the scheduled meeting of the Synod.

On February 21, 2019, the Constitution of Ukraine was amended, with the norms on the strategic course of Ukraine for membership in the European Union and NATO being enshrined in the preamble of the Basic Law, three articles and transitional provisions.

On 21 April 2019, Volodymyr Zelenskyy was elected president in the second round of the presidential election. Early parliamentary elections on July 21 allowed the newly formed pro-presidential Servant of the People party to win an absolute majority of seats for the first time in the history of independent Ukraine (248). Dmytro Razumkov, the party's chairman, was elected speaker of parliament. The majority was able to form a government on August 29 on its own, without forming coalitions, and approved Oleksii Honcharuk as prime minister. On March 4, 2020, due to a 1.5% drop in GDP (instead of a 4.5% increase at the time of the election), the Verkhovna Rada fired Honcharuk's government and Denys Shmyhal became the new Prime Minister.

On July 28, 2020, in Lublin, Lithuania, Poland and Ukraine created the Lublin Triangle initiative, which aims to create further cooperation between the three historical countries of the Polish–Lithuanian Commonwealth and further Ukraine's integration and accession to the EU and NATO.

On May 17, 2021, the Association Trio was formed by signing a joint memorandum between the Foreign Ministers of Georgia, Moldova and Ukraine. Association Trio is tripartite format for the enhanced cooperation, coordination, and dialogue between the three countries (that have signed the Association Agreement with the EU) with the European Union on issues of common interest related to European integration, enhancing cooperation within the framework of the Eastern Partnership, and committing to the prospect of joining the European Union.

At the June 2021 Brussels Summit, NATO leaders reiterated the decision taken at the 2008 Bucharest Summit that Ukraine would become a member of the Alliance with the Membership Action Plan (MAP) as an integral part of the process and Ukraine's right to determine its own future and foreign policy without outside interference.

Ukraine was originally preparing to formally apply for EU membership in 2024, but instead signed an application for membership in February 2022.

==== Russo-Ukrainian War ====
In March 2014, the Annexation of Crimea by the Russian Federation occurred. Though official results of a referendum on Crimean reunification with Russia were reported as showing a large majority in favor of the proposition, the vote was organized under Russian military occupation and was denounced by the European Union and the United States as illegal.

The Crimean crisis was followed by pro-Russian unrest in east Ukraine and south Ukraine. In April 2014 Ukrainian separatists self-proclaimed the Donetsk People's Republic and Lugansk People's Republic and held referendums on 11 May 2014; the separatists claimed nearly 90% voted in favor of independence. Later in April 2014, fighting between the Ukrainian army and pro-Ukrainian volunteer battalions on one side, and forces supporting the Donetsk and Lugansk People's Republics on the other side, escalated into the war in Donbas. By December 2014, more than 6,400 people had died in this conflict, and according to United Nations figures it led to over half a million people becoming internally displaced within Ukraine and two hundred thousand refugees to flee to (mostly) Russia and other neighboring countries. During the same period, political (including adoption of the law on lustration and the law on decommunization) and economic reforms started. On 25 May 2014, Petro Poroshenko was elected president in the first round of the presidential election. By the second half of 2015, independent observers noted that reforms in Ukraine had considerably slowed down, corruption did not subside, and the economy of Ukraine was still in a deep crisis. By December 2015, more than 9,100 people had died (largely civilians) in the war in Donbas, according to United Nations figures.

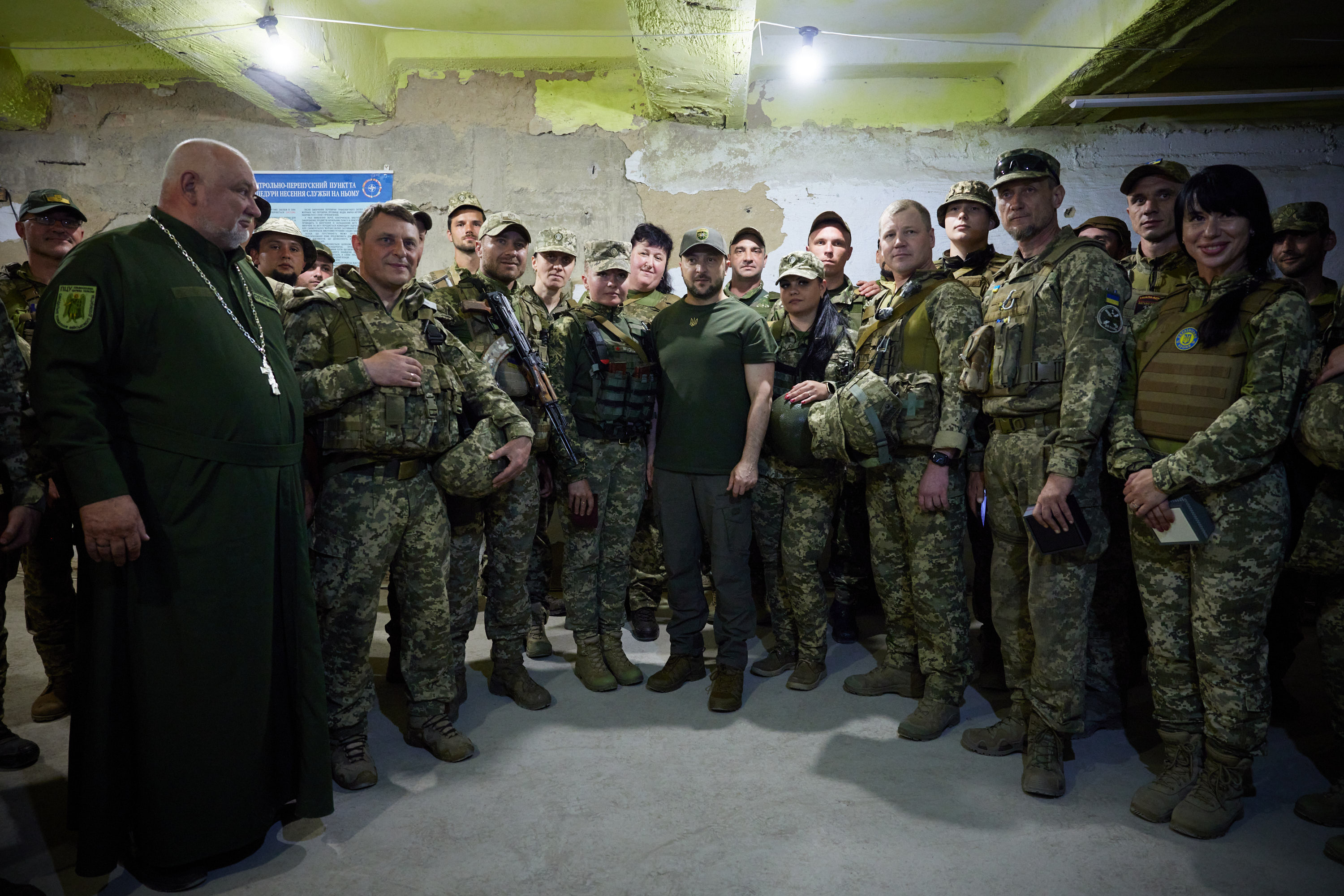
President Zelenskyy with members of the Ukrainian army on 18 June 2022

On February 2, 2021, a presidential decree banned the television broadcasting of the pro-Russian TV channels 112 Ukraine, NewsOne and ZIK. The decision of the National Security and Defense Council and the Presidential Decree of February 19, 2021 imposed sanctions on 8 individuals and 19 legal entities, including Putin's pro-Russian politician and Putin's godfather Viktor Medvedchuk and his wife Oksana Marchenko.

The Kerch Strait incident occurred on 25 November 2018 when the Russian Federal Security Service (FSB) coast guard fired upon and captured three Ukrainian Navy vessels attempting to pass from the Black Sea into the Sea of Azov through the Kerch Strait on their way to the port of Mariupol.

Throughout 2021, Russian forces built up along the Russia-Ukraine Border, in occupied Crimea and Donbas, and in Belarus. On February 24, 2022, Russian forces invaded Ukraine. Russia quickly occupied much of the east and south of the country, but failed to advance past the city of Mykolaiv towards Odesa, and were forced to retreat from the north after failing to occupy Kyiv, Chernihiv, Sumy, and Kharkiv. After failing to gain further territories and being driven out of Kharkiv Oblast by a fast-paced Ukrainian counteroffensive, Russia officially annexed the Donetsk People's Republic and the Luhansk People's Republic, along with most of the Kherson and Zaporizhzhia Oblasts on 30 September.

On the eve of the Russian invasion of Ukraine in 2022, the country was the poorest in Europe, a handicap whose cause was attributed to high corruption levels and the slow pace of economic liberalization and institutional reform. Russia's invasion of the country damaged Ukraine's economy and future prospects of improvement to such an extent, that the GDP of the country was projected to shrink by as much as 35% in its first year alone after the invasion.

== See also ==
- Bibliography of Ukrainian history
- Outline of Ukrainian history
- Politics of Ukraine
- Ruthenia
- Kievan Rus
- History of Christianity in Ukraine
- History of the Soviet Union
- List of Ukrainian rulers
- Ukrainian historiography

== Bibliography ==
=== Surveys and reference ===
- Encyclopedia of Ukraine (University of Toronto Press, 1984–93) 5 vol; from Canadian Institute of Ukrainian Studies, partly online as the Internet Encyclopedia of Ukraine.
- Ukraine: A Concise Encyclopedia. ed by Volodymyr Kubijovyč; University of Toronto Press. 1963; 1188pp
- Allen, W. E. D. (1963). The Ukraine: a history. Russell & Russell. p. 404. OCLC 578666051.
- Bilinsky, Yaroslav The Second Soviet Republic: The Ukraine after World War II (Rutgers UP, 1964)
- Doroshenko, Dmytro, History of the Ukraine. Institute Press (Edmonton, Alberta), 1939: Online.
- Hrushevsky, Mykhailo. A History of Ukraine (1986 [1941]).
- Hrushevsky, Mykhailo. History of Ukraine-Rus' in 9 volumes (1866–1934). Available online in Ukrainian as "Історія України-Руси" (1954–57). Translated into English (1997–2014).
- Ivan Katchanovski; Kohut, Zenon E.; Nebesio, Bohdan Y.; and Yurkevich, Myroslav. Historical Dictionary of Ukraine. Second edition (2013). 968 pp.
- Kubicek, Paul. The History of Ukraine (2008) excerpt and text search
- Liber, George. Total wars and the making of modern Ukraine, 1914–1954 (U of Toronto Press, 2016).
- Magocsi, Paul R. (2010) [1996]. A History of Ukraine: The Land and Its Peoples (2nd rev. ed.). Toronto: University of Toronto Press. ISBN 978-1-4426-1021-7.
- Manning, Clarence, The Story of the Ukraine. Georgetown University Press, 1947: Online.
- Plokhy, Serhii (2006). The Origins of the Slavic Nations: Premodern Identities in Russia, Ukraine, and Belarus. Cambridge University Press. ISBN 978-1-139-45892-4.
- Plokhy, Serhii (2015). The Gates of Europe: A History of Ukraine. Basic Books. ISBN 978-0-465-05091-8.
- Reid, Anna. Borderland: A Journey Through the History of Ukraine (2003) ISBN 0-7538-0160-4
- Snyder, Timothy D. (2003). The Reconstruction of Nations: Poland, Ukraine, Lithuania, Belarus, 1569–1999. Yale U.P. ISBN 978-0-300-10586-5. pp. 105–216.
- Subtelny, Orest (2009). Ukraine: A History. Toronto: University of Toronto Press. ISBN 978-0-8020-8390-6. A Ukrainian translation is available online.
- Wilson, Andrew. The Ukrainians: Unexpected Nation. Yale University Press; 2nd edition (2002) ISBN 0-300-09309-8.
- Yekelchyk, Serhy (2007). Ukraine: Birth of a Modern Nation. Oxford: Oxford University Press. ISBN 978-0-19-530546-3. OCLC 219616283.

=== Topical studies ===
- Kononenko, Konstantyn. Ukraine and Russia: A History of the Economic Relations between Ukraine and Russia, 1654–1917 (Marquette University Press 1958)
- Luckyj, George S. Towards an Intellectual History of Ukraine: An Anthology of Ukrainian Thought from 1710 to 1995. (1996)
- Shkandrij, Myroslav. Ukrainian Nationalism: Politics, Ideology, and Literature, 1929–1956 (Yale University Press; 2014) 331 pages; Studies the ideology and legacy of the Organization of Ukrainian Nationalists Especially by Dmytro Dontsov, Olena Teliha, Leonid Mosendz, Oleh Olzhych, Yurii Lypa, Ulas Samchuk, Yurii Klen, and Dokia Humenna.

=== 1930s, World War II ===
- Applebaum, Anne. Red Famine: Stalin's War on Ukraine (2017); 496 pp online review
- Boshyk, Yuri (1986). Ukraine During World War II: History and Its Aftermath. Canadian Institute of Ukrainian Studies. ISBN 0-920862-37-3.
- Berkhoff, Karel C., Harvest of Despair: Life and Death in Ukraine Under Nazi Rule. Harvard U. Press, 2004. 448 pp.
- Brandon, Ray, and Wendy Lower, eds. The Shoah in Ukraine: History, Testimony, Memorialization. (2008). 378 pp. online review
- Conquest, Robert. The Harvest Of Sorrow: Soviet Collectivisation and the Terror-Famine (1986)
- Gross, Jan T. Revolution from Abroad: The Soviet Conquest of Poland's Western Ukraine and Western Belorussia (1988).
- Kostiuk, Hryhory. Stalinist Rule in the Ukraine. Frederick A. Praeger, Inc., New York, 1960 (156 pp.): Online.
- Kudelia, Serhiy. "Choosing Violence in Irregular Wars: The Case of Anti-Soviet Insurgency in Western Ukraine," East European Politics and Societies (2013) 27#1 pp 149–181
- Lower, Wendy. Nazi Empire-Building and the Holocaust in Ukraine. U. of North Carolina Press, 2005. 307 pp.
- Manning, Clarence, Ukraine under the Soviets. Bookman Associates, New York, 1953 (219 pp.): Online.
- Narvselius, Eleonora. "The 'Bandera Debate': The Contentious Legacy of World War II and Liberalization of Collective Memory in Western Ukraine," Canadian Slavonic Papers (2012) 54#3 pp 469–490.
- Redlich, Shimon. Together and Apart in Brzezany: Poles, Jews, and Ukrainians, 1919–1945. Indiana U. Press, 2002. 202 pp.
- Zabarko, Boris, ed. Holocaust In The Ukraine, Mitchell Vallentine & Co, 2005. 394 pp.

=== Recent history ===
- Aslund, Anders, and Michael McFaul. Revolution in Orange: The Origins of Ukraine's Democratic Breakthrough (2006)
- Blaj, L. (2013). "Ukraine's Independence and Its Geostrategic Impact in Eastern Europe". Debatte: Journal of Contemporary Central and Eastern Europe. 21 (2–3): 165. doi:10.1080/0965156X.2013.841797. S2CID 143454991.
- Paul D'Anieri (1999). Politics and Society in Ukraine. Avalon. ISBN 978-0-8133-3538-4.
- Dimarov, Anatoliy et al. A Hunger Most Cruel: The Human Face of the 1932–1933 Terror-Famine in Soviet Ukraine (2002) excerpt and text search
- Askold Krushelnycky. An Orange Revolution: A Personal Journey Through Ukrainian History. (2006). ISBN 0-436-20623-4. 320 pages.
- Kutaisov, Aleksandr. Ukraina (1918).
- Kuzio, Taras. Ukraine: State and Nation Building (1998)ISBN 0-415-17195-4
- Luckyj, George S. Literary Politics in the Soviet Ukraine, 1917–1934 (1990).ISBN 0-8223-1081-3
- Wanner, Catherine. Burden of Dreams: History and Identity in Post-Soviet Ukraine (1998) excerpt and text search

=== Historiography and memory ===
- von Hagen, Mark (1995). "Does Ukraine Have a History?". Slavic Review. 54 (3): 658–673. doi:10.2307/2501741. ISSN 0037-6779. Wikidata Q113708200.
- Himka, John-Paul. "The National and the Social in the Ukrainian Revolution of 1917-1920- The Historiographical Agenda." Archiv für Sozialgeschichte, vol 34 (1994): 95–110.
- Hrushevskyi, Mykhailo (1904). "The traditional scheme of 'Russian' history and the problem of a rational organization of the history of the East Slavs". Articles on Slavistics (in Ukrainian). 1, 2 (55, 2): 35–42, 355–364. Wikidata Q28703759.
- Kasianov, Georgiy, and Philipp Ther, eds. Laboratory of Transnational History: Ukraine and Recent Ukrainian Historiography (Central European University Press 2009)
- Krawchenko, Bohdan. "Ukrainian studies in Canada." Nationalities Papers 6.1 (1978): 26–43.
- Plokhy, Serhii, ed. (2016), The Future of the Past: New Perspectives on Ukrainian History, Harvard Ukrainian Research Institute, OL 20220458W, Wikidata Q116456399
- Plokhy, Serhii (2021). Quo Vadis Ukrainian History?. pp. 1–14. doi:10.2307/j.ctv2902b86.6. ISBN 978-0-674-26885-2. Wikidata Q116456336.
- Reid, Anna. "Putin's War on History: The Thousand-Year Struggle Over Ukraine" Foreign Affairs (May/June 2022) 101#1 pp 54–63. excerpt
- Smith-Peter, Susan (1 April 2022). "What do Scholars of Russia owe Ukraine?". Jordan Center for the Advanced Study of Russia. Jordan Center for the Advanced Study of Russia. Wikidata Q116456099.
- Subtelny, Orest. "The Current State of Ukrainian Historiography". Journal of Ukrainian Studies. 18 (1–2): 33–54. ISSN 0228-1635. Wikidata Q116456077.
- Velychenko, Stephen, National history as cultural process: a survey of the interpretations of Ukraine's past in Polish, Russian, and Ukrainian historical writing from the earliest times to 1914 (Edmonton, 1992)
- Velychenko, Stephen, Shaping identity in Eastern Europe and Russia: Soviet-Russian and Polish accounts of Ukrainian history, 1914–1991 (London, 1993)
- Verstiuk, Vladyslav. "Conceptual Issues in Studying the History of the Ukrainian Revolution." Journal of Ukrainian Studies 24.1 (1999): 5–20
- Wade, Rex A. "The Revolution At Ninety-(One): Anglo-American Historiography Of The Russian Revolution Of 1917" Journal of Modern Russian History and Historiography 1.1 (2008): vii-42.
- Yekelchyk, Serhy. "Studying the Blueprint for a Nation: Canadian Historiography of Modern Ukraine." East/West: Journal of Ukrainian Studies 5.1 (2018).

=== Teaching and study guides ===
- John Vsetecka, "Integrating Scholarship on Ukraine into Classroom SyllabiLet Ukraine Speak: Integrating Scholarship on Ukraine into Classroom Syllabii".
- Harvard Ukrainian Research Institute, "Teaching and Studying Ukraine: List of Resources".

=== Primary sources in English ===
- Luckyj, George S. Towards an Intellectual History of Ukraine: An Anthology of Ukrainian Thought from 1710 to 1995. (1996)

==== Ukrainian language ====
- Essays on History on Ukraine
  - Volume 1 by Natalia Yakovenko, "From the Earliest Times until the End of the 18th Century"
  - Volume 2: Ярослав Грицак (Yaroslav Hrytsak) (1996). Формування модерної української нації XIX-XX ст. (Formation of the Modern Ukrainian Nation in the late 19th–20th centuries). Kyiv: Генеза (Heneza). ISBN 966-504-150-9.. Available online.
- "Ukraine: Briefly about Her Past and Present ", in Welcome to Ukraine, 2003, 1.
- Alexander F. Tsvirkun History of Ukraine.7 class electronic textbooks. Kyiv., 2005 (co-authored with Valentin A.Savelii)
- Alexander F. Tsvirkun E-learning course. History of Ukraine. Journal Auditorium, Kyiv 2010
