= DTEK Academy =

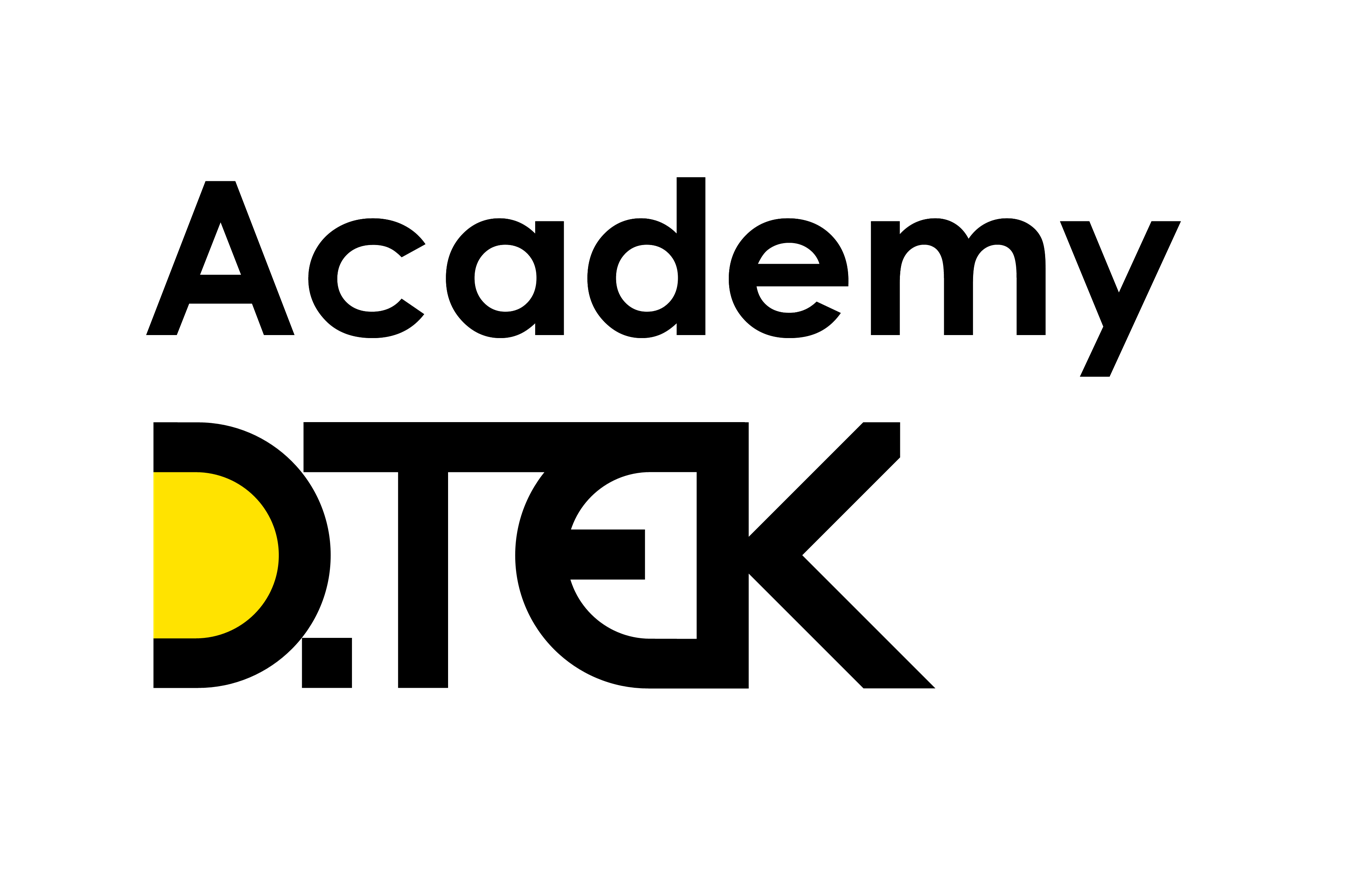
- Founded: 2010
- Headquarters: 75, Zhylianska Str., Kyiv, Ukraine
- Website: dtekacademy.com

DTEK Academy (Russian: Академия ДТЭК, Ukrainian: Академiя ДТЕК) is a corporate university of DTEK energy company. DTEK strategic holding company manages three operational sub-holding companies with the assets in the sectors of conventional energy, alternative energy and hydrocarbons production. DTEK is part of the financial and industrial group System Capital Management (SCM). The shareholder of the group is a Ukrainian businessman Rinat Akhmetov. DTEK Chief Executive Officer is Maksym Tymchenko. DTEK Academy was founded in 2010 as a common knowledge management centre for all DTEK's companies, providing services to all employees from grassroots workers to senior executives. It is a tool for shaping the company's ideology and developing methods of fostering talents.

DTEK Academy is a member of international associations CEEMAN and EFMD. Since 2013, it has also been providing training services to external clients.

Academy's Targets until 2020:

Talents: to prepare 70% of talented employees to hold managerial positions.

To improve the quality of training in 87 blue-collar professions in Ukraine.

To bring up a new generation of the HR business partners in the international market.

== History ==
DTEK Academy was founded in March 2010 in Donetsk.

The MBA Programme 'Energy of Knowledge' created for middle and top-level managers was launched at the same time. In May 2010, DTEK Academy started the 'Energy of Leader' programme designed for senior executives on the basis of the concept of 5 Roles of DTEK's Leader: Leader, Strategist, Operator, Mentor, and Team Player. The programmes were designed together with leading European and Ukrainian business schools, including LBS, INSEAD and Kyiv Mohyla Business School.

Apart from modular programmes for managers, DTEK Academy also offers competences development programmes, professional training courses, online e-courses, foreign language courses and special programmes for the talent pool and potential successors included into the TOP 50 programme.

In November 2010, DTEK Academy launched a culture project of the DTEK Academy Movie Club as an informal method of personnel development.

The same year a project started on creating the Institute of In-house Coaches out of companies' employees to implement a common training system at DTEK Academy Branches.

Since 2011, DTEK Academy has been a member of international business education associations CEEMAN and EFMD.

In 2012, DTEK Academy launched the second culture project 'English Speaking Club' with native English speakers.

In 2012, it implemented a large-scale project 'Modernisation of the On-the-Job Training System at DTEK Group Companies', and as part of which professional and educational standards were designed for five key jobs; two DTEK-sponsored Departments were opened in the universities (Donetsk National Technical University, Donetsk, and the National Mining University, Dnipropetrovsk) as well as 13 Branches of DTEK Academy created on the basis of the companies' training centres.

The first international conference for senior executives and HR managers 'Corporate Education: Challenges and Prospects' took place on 30 November 2012.

The second international conference 'Corporate Education: from Costs to Investment' was held on 19 and 20 September 2013.

On 27 June 2014, a series of master classes started: workshops by international professors and experts for Ukrainian business community. The first master class 'How to Manage in the Conditions of Uncertainty' was held by Dave Snowden, a leading expert in strategic thinking, a creator of the unique system of planning in the conditions of uncertainty Cynefin.

In July 2014, the 'Underground Miner' professional standard prepared by DTEK was approved by the Ministry of Education and Science of Ukraine as the state standard of the professional technical education, which was the first such case in the history of Ukraine.

In July 2014, the third culture project — the Debate Club— was launched to promote skills of public speaking, persuasion and influence, active listening and objection handling.

On 18 September 2014, DTEK Academy was opened in Kyiv.

In October 2014, DTEK Academy launched a 'HR-Coffee House' project, which envisaged 12 meetings of HR executives where they could discuss key issues of the effective functioning of the HR system and current trends in human resources management.

November 2014: a master class on Risk Management by Dr Ronald Huisman, Erasmus School of Economics, Rotterdam.

In November 2014, the academy implemented two new cultural initiatives: Photo Club and Creativity Workshop, which help developing creativity and unconventional approaches to tackling business tasks.

Since 2015, DTEK Academy has become a partner for a number of national conferences and HR clubs: Team Forum 3 'Conquering Employees' Hearts', Human Capital Insights, HRD Forum, HR-Land and HR-Space.

March 2015: launch of the HR Business Partner programme aimed at developing the HR function as a business partner in professional community.

February 2022: DTEK Academy has become a partner of American University of Kyiv (AUK).

== Statistics ==
DTEK Academy educates about 92.5 thousand employees annually.

It has over 1,000 training programmes.

There are training courses for 128 blue-collar jobs.

Over 100 corporate programmes have been implemented for external clients.

There are 13 Academy branches at DTEK enterprises

DTEK Academy has over 300 coaches and 850 in-house experts.

Five new informal development methods (the club system: Film Club, Debate Club, Speaking Club, Creativity Workshops, and Photo Club).

== Programmes ==
Energy of Leader programme for senior executives and business owners.

Energy of Knowledge MBA programme for middle-level managers and senior executives.

HR Business-partner for HR executives and specialists of mid-size companies.

Competence training sessions for specialists, managers and middle-level executives.

Production management for operating companies' managers.

== Awards ==
2010: the winner of the second National CRS Projects' Contest held by the Corporate Social Responsibility Development Centre in the 'Labour Relations' nomination with a project on corporate university establishment.

'Introduction to the Coal Industry' electronic learning course by DTEK Academy won all four nominations in the contest Best E-Learning Course Created with Courselab 2010 Software organized by WebSoft company. In 2011, 'Basics of the Energy Industry' e-learning course became the winner of WebSoft contest once again.

April 2011: the winner of the Trainings INDEX 2011 award, established by Amplua company, in the nomination 'The effective Start of the Personnel Training And Development System.'

In November 2011, the academy won the title HR-BRAND Ukraine 2011 as part of the annual independent HeadHunter award.

In 2013, the 'DTEK's Generation' project aimed at the cooperation with higher education establishments of Ukraine won the prestigious Human Capital 2013 award!

September 2014: a laureate of Crystal Pyramid award in 2 nominations: Corporate University 2014 and HR Project of 2014.

December 2014: the Best Employer of Ukraine Award according to ranking of business publisher Capital.

== Partners ==
- INSEAD
- KMBS
- CEEMAN
- EFMD
- Coursera
- LBS
- "Wharton School of the University of Pennsylvania". wharton.upenn.edu.
- Амплуа
- Lege Artis
