= Vsevolod Starukhin =

Russian businessperson (born 1971)

- Born: December 13, 1971 (age 54); Karaganda, Kazakhstan
- Other name: Всеволод Анатольевич Старухин

Vsevolod Starukhin (Russian: Всеволод Анатольевич Старухин; born 13 December 1971 in Karaganda, Kazakhstan) is a manager, PhD in economics.

== Biography ==
Vsevolod Starukhin graduated from the Warsaw School of Economics with a degree in international economics in 1995. In 2003, he was awarded a doctorate (PhD) in economic sciences by the Moscow Academy of Labour and Social Relations. During his work at DTEK, he received a diploma as part of the joint programme of London Business School (the UK) and DTEK Academy. While working at SIBUR completed corporate MBA programme at INSEAD.

Starukhin began his career at Kraft Jacobs Suchard, where he worked as a treasury manager in 1995–1996. From 1996 to 2006, he headed the financial functions of Mars in Russia, Hungary, the Netherlands and Brazil. In 2006–2008, he worked at Schlumberger as a chief financial officer in Russia. In 2008, he became chief financial officer of the alumina division of RUSAL.

Starukhin joined DTEK in 2009 as a chief financial officer. In 2014, Starukhin was appointed the chief executive officer of DTEK Energy subholding. In 2017, he joined Sibur as commercial excellence director, since 2019 acts as operating officer in the Plastics Elastomers & Organic Synthesis division of SIBUR.
