= Maksym Timchenko =

- Максим Тімченко
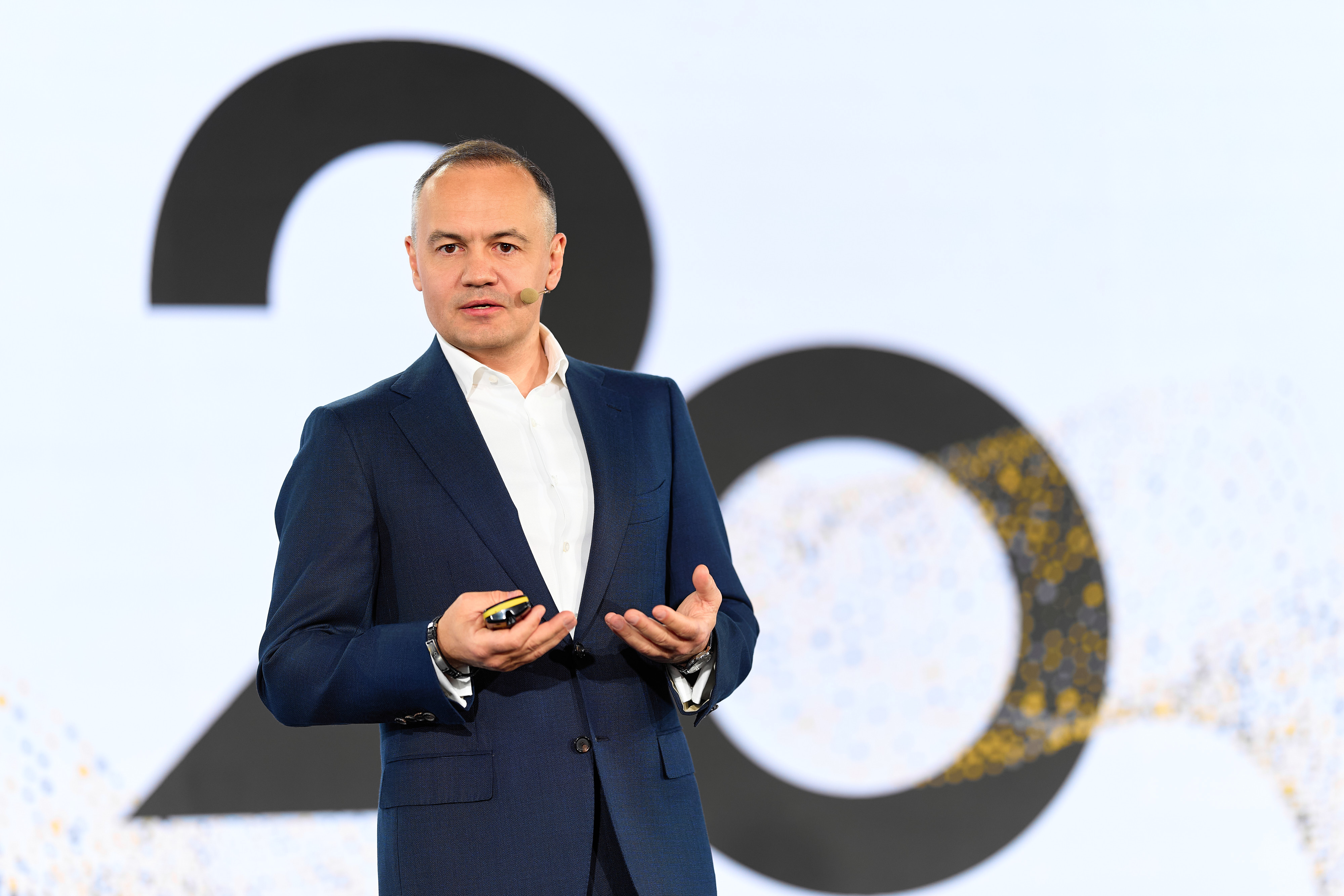
- Timchenko in 2024
- Born: 12 August 1975 (age 50); Novoselitsy, Novgorod Oblast, USSR
- Other names: Maksym Tymchenko
- Education: Donetsk State Academy of Management and University of Manchester
- Occupation: Business executive
- Known for: CEO, chairman of the management board of DTEK

Maksym Timchenko (also spelled Maxim Tymchenko; Ukrainian: Максим Вікторович Тімченко; born 12 August 1975) is Ukrainian business executive who is the chief executive officer of Ukrainian energy company DTEK. He has headed the company since its foundation in 2005.

Maxim Timchenko is a member of the Electricity Governors community, which brings together business leaders and partner organizations from the World Economic Forum. He also serves on the supervisory board of the American University Kyiv.

== Education ==
Timchenko graduated with honours from the Donetsk State Academy of Management, majoring in Production Management. He continued his education at the University of Manchester, where he obtained a diploma with honours and a Bachelor of Arts degree in Economic and Social Studies.

In 2011, he completed the joint Executive Development Programme – Energy of a Leader – run by the DTEK Academy and the London Business School. He is a member of the Association of Chartered Certified Accountants (ACCA).

== Career ==
Maxim Timchenko started his career in 1999 at PricewaterhouseCoopers, where he was promoted from consultant to senior auditor. Between 2002 and 2005, he worked as a senior manager at SCM; he supervised the work of SCM's energy business until it spun off into DTEK.

=== Managing DTEK ===
Timchenko has been DTEK's chief executive officer since its founding in July 2005. He promoted the establishment of a vertically-integrated chain of companies within the SCM Group. DTEK's subsidiaries operate in the areas of coal mining, and electricity generation and distribution, which allowed the company to overcome the 2008 global economic crisis. The vertical integration provided the company with necessary financial security and development opportunities, even in adverse conditions. To date, DTEK is Ukraine's leading and biggest private investor in the energy sector, with a presence in 24 countries, and its subsidiaries are involved in coal and natural gas extraction; electricity generation from wind, solar, and thermal power plants; energy resources trading in national and international markets; distributing and supplying electricity to consumers; providing energy efficiency services to customers; and developing high-speed charging station networks. In each of DTEK's distinct business areas, production companies are merged into operating holding companies. According to Deloitte, DTEK is among the top ten most dynamic companies in Central and Eastern Europe.

Following Russia's military aggression against Ukraine from 2014 and the full-scale invasion in 2022, Timchenko directed to maintain power supplies, overseeing the rebuilding of destroyed energy infrastructure and the accelerated development of new energy assets, including Ukraine's largest wind farm and battery storage project. Timchenko has also been a leading advocate for Ukraine's integration into Europe's energy system, promoting cross-border energy connections, domestic market reforms, and partnerships with international businesses to attract foreign investment into Ukraine.

Since 2019, Timchenko has been a member of the UN Global Compact on Ukraine's Supervisory Board. He leads Academy DTEK's MBA project commission, suggesting non-standard formats for training projects, as well as developing Ukraine's educational ecosystem.

== Recognition ==
- Ranked in the top ten in the TOP-100. Best Top Managers of Ukraine 2010 rating of the publishing house Ekonomika
- Best top manager of Ukraine in the nomination Change Management in the Organisation 2010 in the TOP-100 rating of the publishing house Ekonomika
- Best top manager of Ukraine in the Energy 2012-2013 category in the TOP-100 rating of the publishing house Ekonomika
- Best top manager of Ukraine in the M&A Leader 2013 nomination in the TOP-100 rating of the publishing house Ekonomika
- Ranked in the top ten of the 25 Best СЕО rating of Forbes Ukraine
- In 2021 topped the rating of the best managers in Ukraine according to the magazine "TOP 100. Ratings of the largest"
- Named one of Ukraine's ten most influential CEOs by Forbes Ukraine
- Named Leader of the Year at the 2024 Global Good Awards
- Named one of TIME's TIME100 climate leaders in 2025
- Awarded an Honorary Fellowship of the Energy Institute in 2026 for his leadership in maintaining Ukraine's energy system during wartime

== Publications ==
- Europe can replace its lost Russian energy supply with this surprising partner (WEF)
- Help Ukraine now, and it could power Europe later (Atlantic Council)
- Ukraine is ready to support the reinvention of European energy security (Euractiv)
- The Future of the Ukrainian Energy Sector. Interview with Maxim Timchenko, the CEO at DTEK
- Interview with DTEK's CEO Maxim Timchenko to RBC Ukraine
- DTEK CEO Maxim Timchenko: Directionless Lobbying is not the way to create a business (RBC)
- Mounting crisis: The DTEK story, as told by Maxim Timchenko (Kyiv Post)
- Ukraine must work with leading nations to build sustainable energy markets (WEF)
- Maxim Timchenko: Environmental, social and corporate governance — the new bedrock for business (Kyiv Post)
- Maxim Timchenko: Energy for a new Ukraine (Kyiv Post)
