= Lustration in Ukraine =

Removal from office of some civil servants

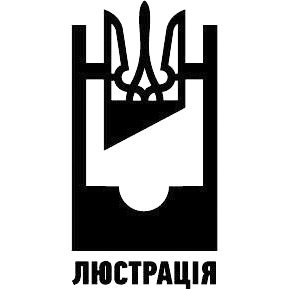
Logo of the Ukrainian Lustration Committee

In Ukraine, lustration (Ukrainian: люстрація, romanized: liustratsiia) refers to the removal from public office of civil servants who served under Ukrainian President Viktor Yanukovych. This measure was initiated under president Petro Poroshenko, after Yanukovych was deposed in the Revolution of Dignity. This lustration also applies to civil servants who were active in the Communist Party of the Soviet Union prior to 1991. A 2019 proposal by the newly elected president Volodymyr Zelenskyy proposed to expand the lustration to the officials who served under Poroshenko, citing the dissatisfaction many Ukrainians felt with Ukraine’s largely ineffective bureaucracy by the time Poroshenko’s presidential term ended. The proposal attracted much more criticism, including international criticism, than the first round of lustration (2014), both because Poroshenko peacefully turned over power to Zelenskyy as well as the view held amongst many Ukrainians that Poroshenko’s presidency was much less corrupt than Yanukovych’s. Nonetheless, the ECHR’s ruling has important implications for future such programs. A week after the proposal, a member of Zelenskyy’s Servant of the People party proposed to end the policy of lustration. By 2020, lustration had been argued to be relatively successful in purging much of Ukraine’s previous corrupt bureaucracy, as well as purging pro-Russian officials who served under President Yanukovych. However, it was also argued to be somewhat of a failure in that many representatives of Yanukovych’s Party of Regions remained with political influence, although as the political opposition in Ukraine, and instead now named the “Opposition Bloc”. Amidst the Russo-Ukrainian War, in 2022 the Opposition Bloc, along with other pro-Russian parties, were banned, resulting in lustration being completed after 8 years.

The name "lustration" alludes to similar purges of civil servants that took place in Eastern Europe following the dissolution of the Soviet Union. The exclusion from service is set to a term of five to ten years.

== Overview ==
The purpose of the lustration campaign is to remove from public office "for ten years and others for five years" civil servants who worked under Ukrainian President Viktor Yanukovych for more than a year "and did not resign of their own accord" between 25 February 2010 and 22 February 2014 and civil servants "who were elected and worked in high positions in the Soviet Communist Party, were permanent workers or secret agents of the Soviet KGB, the Main Intelligence Department of the Soviet Defense Ministry, graduated from higher education establishments of the Soviet KGB (except for technical specializations), worked with the special services of foreign countries as secret informers or carried out events aimed at sabotaging the foundations of Ukraine's national security, defense or territorial integrity by their actions or lack thereof, made public calls for violations of the territorial integrity and sovereignty of Ukraine, or fanned ethnic feud".

The complete process of checking all civil servants is to be completed in December 2016. Elected offices like the President of Ukraine and People's Deputies of Ukraine will not be subject to lustration checks. Current judges of the Constitutional Court of Ukraine and the Supreme Court of Ukraine will not be subject to lustration either.

== History ==
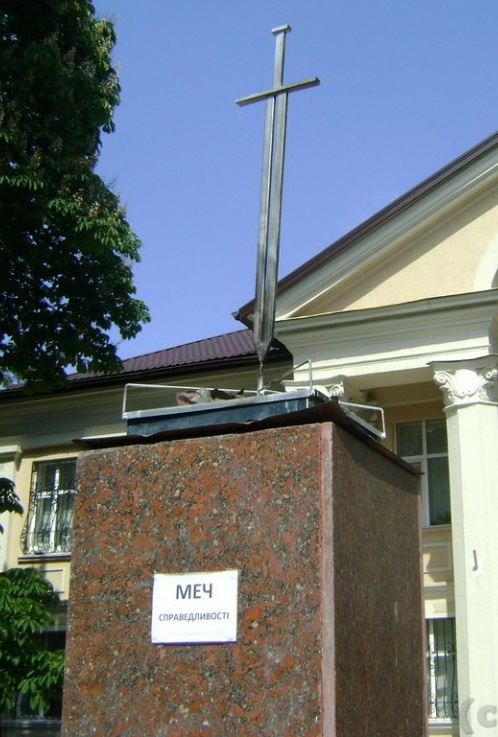
Monument "Sword of Justice" in Brovary symbolized lustration and the fight against corruption in a city

Lustration was one of the demands of the Euromaidan-protestors. The Euromaidan protests started in November 2013 and ended with the 22 February 2014 removal of office of President Yanukovych. On 26 February 2014, Yehor Soboliev was nominated to lead the "Committee on Lustration" in the new Yatsenyuk Government. On 16 September 2014, the Ukrainian parliament adopted a bill on government lustration that introduced "procedures for conducting checks of government officials and people nominated for government position with the purpose of deciding whether they meet certain criteria for occupying relevant post". The bill was passed with the support of 252 out of 450 MPs. On 16 September 2014 the Ukrainian parliament at the third reading adopted the law on lustration and thus finally passed the bill that took effect on 16 October 2014. The head of the working group which finalized the bill on lustration, Yuriy Derevianko, said that the adopted document differed from the bill considered by the parliament at first reading.

The first lustration wave, in October 2014, resulted in the removal of 39 high-ranking officials. By mid-September 2015 700 officials were lustrated/fired.

== Criticism ==
According to General Prosecutor of Ukraine Vitaly Yarema the lustration law adopted by the Ukrainian parliament complied neither with the Ukrainian Constitution nor international law, and he warned "its enactment will have negative consequences".

Volodymyr Yavorsky of the Kharkiv Human Rights Protection Group described the 14 August 2014 lustration bill as "unreasonable." He warned that its implementation would entail "serious systematic violations of human rights," because, among other reasons, too many people would be affected by it, including the effects of dismissing officials who could not be easily replaced.

The Council of Europe's Venice Commission ruled on 12 December 2014 that the lustration law contained some serious flaws; it called for revision of the lustration criteria, administrative decisions on lustration to be postponed and that information on who is subject to lustration should only be published after a final court ruling issued.

== See also ==
- Decommunization in Ukraine
- Derussification in Ukraine
