= Clarence Manning =

American slavicist (1893–1972)

Clarence Augustus Manning
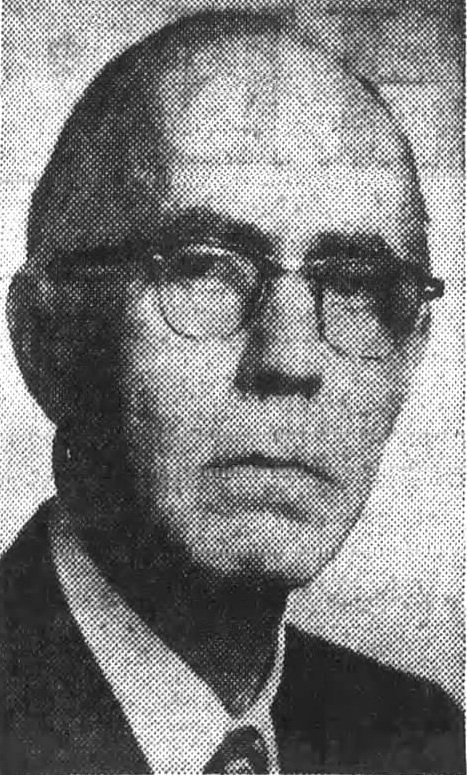
- Clarence Augustus Manning
- Born: April 1, 1893; New York City, US
- Died: October 4, 1972 (aged 79); Pleasantville, New Jersey, US
- Burial place: Saint Paul's Church Cemetery, Mount Vernon
- Education: Columbia University
- Occupations: Professor, translator, slavist, writer
- Employer: Columbia University
- Title: Professor

Clarence Augustus Manning (April 1, 1893 – October 4, 1972) was an American slavicist. He worked for 43 years at the Columbia University in New York, eventually being appointed chairman of the Department of Slavic Studies. He published a number of studies on Slavic languages, countries and people, as well as translations of important Slavic works of literature, and was a pioneer in opening the field of study of Slavic peoples in the U.S. beyond the dominance of Russian studies of the times.

Clarence received his bachelor's degree at the Columbia University in 1912 and master's in 1913. During First World War, he worked in the intelligence police corps of the translation section of the Military Intelligence Division, having rank of sergeant. In 1915 he received his PhD, then became a lecturer in Slavic languages in 1917 and an instructor in 1921.

In 1922, he became acting head of the department of Slavic languages in absence of John Dyneley Prince, and later that year spent three months travelling through Eastern Europe, visiting Slavic countries and Greece.

In 1924 he received the rank of assistant professor, in 1935 became assistant professor of European languages, and in 1947 assistant professor of Slavic languages. In 1948, he received an honorary PhD from the Ukrainian Free University in Munich. He was also a member of the School of Slavonic and East European Studies (which today forms part of University College London), Shevchenko Scientific Society and Slavonic Institute of Prague.

In 1952 he became associate professor of Slavic languages. He retired in 1958, but continued publishing until his death in 1972. He was married to Louise Marshall, and had one daughter, Alice Vail.

== Bibliography ==
- A study of archaism in Euripides (1916)
- Professionalism in Greek athletics (1917)
- Birds of Heaven, and Other Stories by Vladimir Galaktionovich Korolenko (1919)
- Dostoyevsky and Modern Russian Literature (1922)
- An anthology of Czechoslovak poetry (1929)
- Marko, The King's Son: Hero of The Serbs (1932)
- Ivan Franko (1937)
- Karel Čapek (1941)
- Ukrainian Literature: Studies Of The Leading Authors (1944, reprinted in 1971)
- Taras Shevchenko: Selected Poems (1945)
- Soldier of Liberty, Casimir Pulaski (1945)
- The Axis satellites and Greece, our ally (1946)
- The Story of the Ukraine (1947): online
- Outline of Ukrainian History (1949, second edition 1964)
- Spirit of Flame: Lesya Ukrainka (1950), editor
- Twentieth Century Ukraine (1951)
- The Siberian Fiasco (1952)
- The Forgotten Republics (1952)
- Russian Influence On Early America (1953)
- The Rays of the Microcosm (1953)
- Ukraine Under the Soviets (1953): online
- Bellerophon: N. J. Spyropoulos (1955)
- A History of Slavic studies in the United States (1957)
- Hetman of Ukraine: Ivan Mazeppa (1957)
- Manning, Clarence A.; Smal-Stocki Roman (1960). The History Of Modern Bulgarian Literature. Westport, Connecticut: Greenwood Publishers – via Internet Archive.
- Ukraine: A Concise Encyclopedia (1963), contributor—Volodymyr Kubijovyc, editor
