= IConnectHere =

iConnectHere is the consumer division of Deltathree, which provides VoIP internet telephony service to consumers and businesses worldwide. The company's products are: Broadband (Internet) Phones, PC to Phone service, Mobile Dialers, Calling Cards and local phone numbers.

== History ==
Deltathree was founded in 1996 and on March 14, 1997, first demonstrated a direct telephone conversation over the Internet. By June 1999, deltathree's PC-to-Phone and Phone-to-Phone services became commercially available. In September 2001 the iConnectHere brand and service was launched with even lower rates that initially offered.

On December 19, 2001, Deltathree announced that iConnectHere would offer its PC-to-phone service to MSN Messenger and Windows Messenger users in 17 countries.

In 2007, Deltathree launched a communications solution called JoIP jointly with Panasonic. JoIP is a service enabling regular phone owners of Panasonic's Globrange to make cheap international calls.

In July 2010, Deltathree launched a communications solution called the JoIP Mobile (mobile.joip.com). This VoIP mobile dialer can be downloaded to the mobile (practically any smartphone) of the user: BlackBerry OS, Symbian OS, Android OS and iPhone. Windows OS and Blackberry will soon be launched as well.

On August 1, 2017, Deltathree, LLC, provider of iConnecthere discontinued service.

== Client applications and devices ==
iConnectHere provides a free client applications such as the PC to Phone Dialer and Mobile Dialers as part of its service; to date the application had 8 major releases (current version is 8). Additionally, iConnectHere offers a free broadband phone adapter from Linksys along with the Pay as you Go World Plans with local receiving calls numbers all over the world among other international and U.S calling plans.
