= Elie Wurtman =

Israeli business executive (born 1969)

- אלי וורטמן
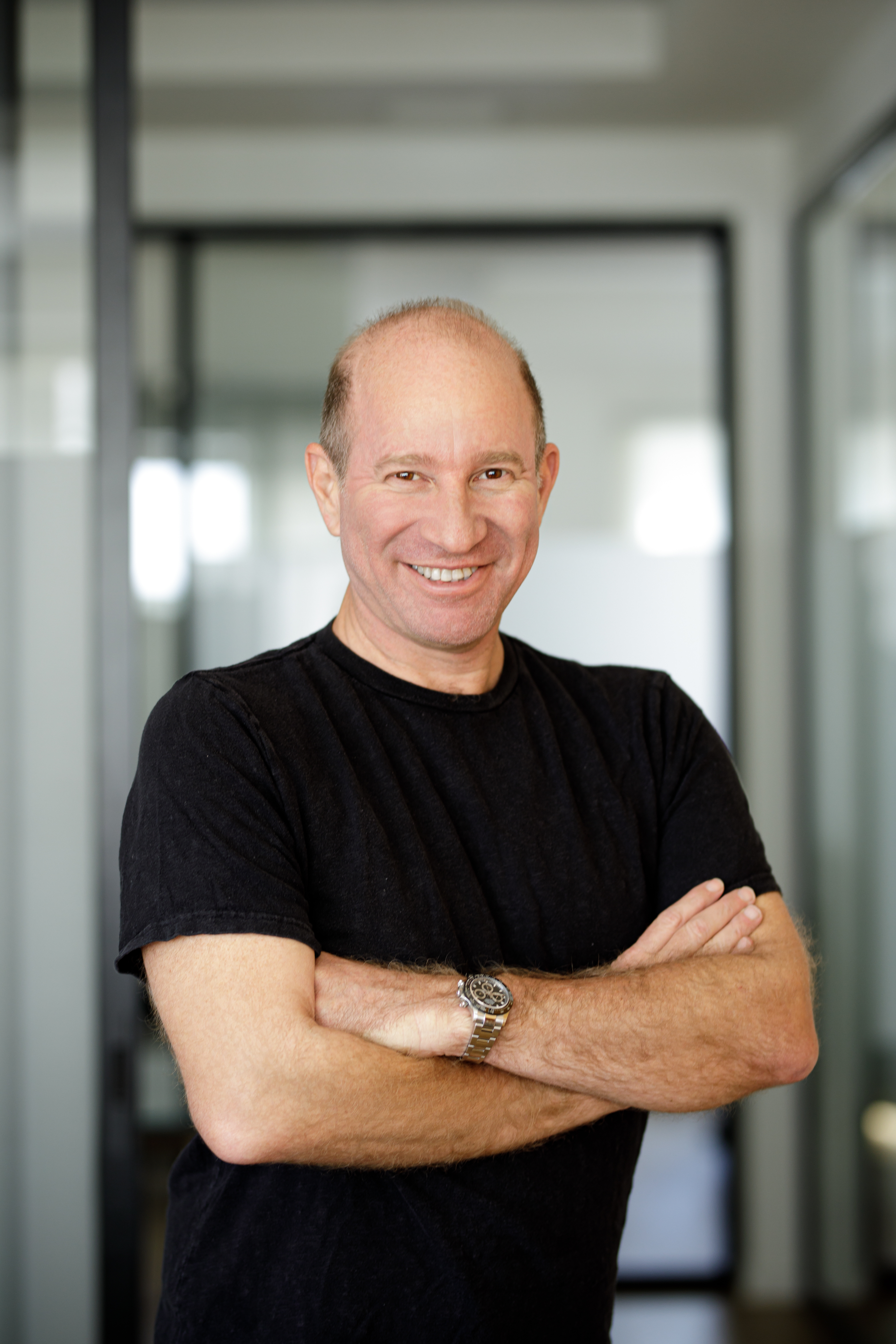
- Born: August 30, 1969 (age 57)
- Education: Columbia University; Jewish Theological Seminary of America
- Occupation: Business executive
- Title: Managing Partner, PICO Venture Partners

Elie Wurtman (Hebrew: אלי וורטמן; born August 30, 1969) is an Israeli venture capitalist, businessman, and high-tech and social entrepreneur. He co-founded and served as the first Executive Chairman of the e-commerce company Vroom, which went public in June 2020. He is the co-founder of PICO Venture Partners, a Jerusalem-based venture capital fund, PICO Kids, and Bat Shlomo Vineyards.

== Early life and education ==
Wurtman was born in Philadelphia, Pennsylvania, and immigrated to Jerusalem with his family when he was eight years old. In 1991, Wurtman graduated with a bachelor's degree in political science from Columbia University and a bachelor's degree in Talmud from the Jewish Theological Seminary of America.

== Career ==
In 1996, together with Jacob Ner-David, Wurtman co-founded and served as CEO of Deltathree, one of the first companies to offer telephony services over the Internet. He took the firm public in November 1999.

Wurtman began his venture capital career at Jerusalem Venture Partners, where he worked from 2003 to 2006 leading investments in early-stage media technology as well as enterprise software. From 2006 to 2012, he served as general partner at Benchmark Capital.

From 2011 to 2014, Wurtman was Executive Chairman of NJOY. In 2014, Wurtman co-founded Vroom with Allon Bloch, Marshall Chesrown, and Kevin Westfall. From 2014 to 2016, he served as Vroom's first Executive Chairman and remained as a director until the company's IPO in June 2020.

In 2015, Wurtman founded PICO Venture Partners, to invest in early-stage start-ups. PICO Venture Partners was the first investor in companies including Vroom and Spot.io (which was sold to American NetApp for $450 million). PICO has also invested in startups including K Health, Ravin AI and Gloat.

Among other industries, PICO Venture Partners focuses on enterprise software, SaaS, automotive retail, fintech, e-commerce and cyber security.

In 2020, Wurtman traveled to the United Arab Emirates, as part of the Abraham Accords Business Summit led by US Treasury Secretary Steven Mnuchin.

== Social entrepreneurship ==
Wurtman is a social entrepreneur, community advocate, and Middle East Leadership Initiative Fellow at the Aspen Institute. His work includes youth education and economic redevelopment of the Talpiot industrial area in Jerusalem. Beginning in 2012, Wurtman helped attract start-ups and leading ecosystem companies and organizations to the Talpiot industrial area, including AutoLeadStar, Modli and Start-Up Nation Central. Wurtman sits on the board of the Tower of David Museum.

In 2013, Wurtman founded PICO Kids, a non-profit organization in Jerusalem that educates youth across the city about STEEM (Science, Technology, Engineering, Entrepreneurship, and Math) through project-based learning. The organization serves elementary and high school students from diverse economic, social, and religious groups.

== See also ==
- Economy of Israel
- Startup Nation
