= Baruch Sterman =

- ברוך סטרמן
- Born: June 10, 1961 (age 65); United States
- Education: Columbia University; Hebrew University of Jerusalem
- Occupations: CTO/CEO; Physicist; Writer
- Organization(s): Bell Labs; Vonage; Ptil Tekhelet
- Spouse: Judy Taubes Sterman
- Website: www.baruchsterman.com

Baruch Sterman (Hebrew: ברוך סטרמן) is an American-born Israeli physicist, technologist, and writer.

Sterman has carried out research, written, and lectured on the topic of Tekhelet, the ancient Biblical Blue dye, and has helped reconstruct the manufacturing process in accordance with the principles of Jewish law.

== Biography ==
=== Education ===
Sterman studied physics at Yeshiva University, received his master's degree in Electrical Engineering from Columbia University, and his doctorate in Physics, from the Hebrew University of Jerusalem, where he specialized in Quantum optics.

=== Career ===
Sterman began his career as a programmer in the Satellite Software division at Bell Labs. As a technologist, he worked in the area of Voice over IP as CTO at Deltathree, as founder and CEO of Kayote Networks, and then as Chief Scientist at Vonage. He helped adapt AAA (computer security) (Authentication, Authorization, Accounting) to SIP and authored IETF RFC 4590/5090.

He is also recognized for his contributions in researching the ancient Biblical Blue dye known as Tekhelet. In 2012, he published, The Rarest Blue, which he co-wrote with his wife Judy Taubes Sterman, on the topic. The book received The Jewish Journal Book award in the same year.

Sterman is a co-founder of the non-profit Ptil Tekhelet together with Rabbi Eliyahu Tavger, Dr. Ari Greenspan, and Joel Guberman. The organization seeks to facilitate Tekhelet production, support research, and educational endeavors. Sterman is currently the CEO of the organization.

=== Personal life ===
Sterman is married to Judy Taubes Sterman, and together they have seven children.

== Bibliography ==
- Sterman, Baruch; Taubes Sterman, Judy (2012). Rarest Blue: The Remarkable Story of an Ancient Color Lost to History and Rediscovered
- Hokhma LiShlomo: Essays in Honor of Rabbi Dr. Shlomo Riskin (co-edited with Judy Sterman)
