= Demian Kudryavtsev =

Russian media manager and entrepreneur

Demyan Kudryavtsev
- Демьян Кудрявцев
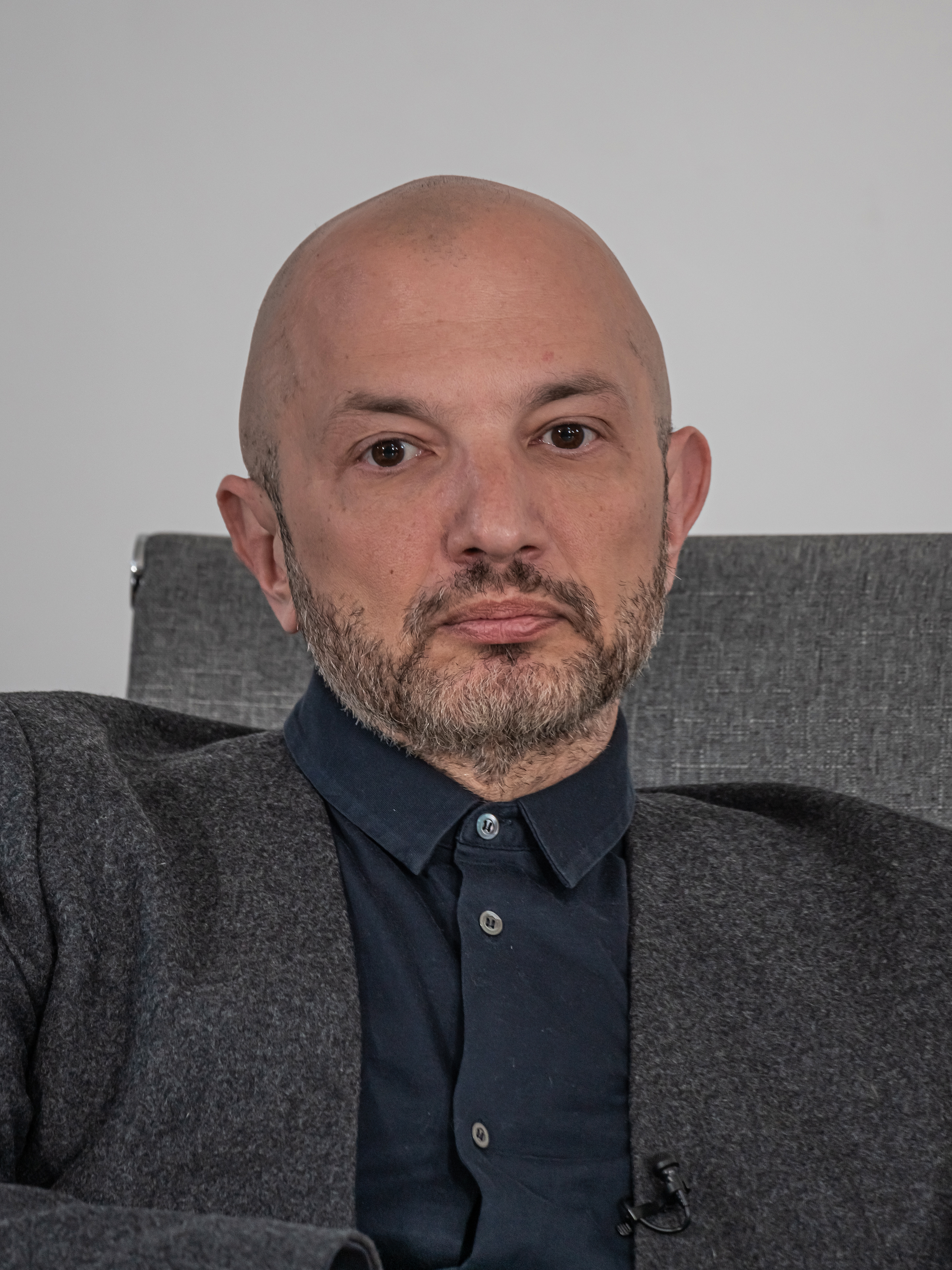
- Kudryavtsev in 2025
- Born: 17 December 1971 (age 54); Leningrad, Russian SFSR, Soviet Union
- Education: Leningrad State University; Hebrew University of Jerusalem
- Occupations: Entrepreneur; media manager
- Years active: 1990–present
- Organization(s): Kommersant, Vedomosti, The Moscow Times

Demyan Borisovich Kudryavtsev (Russian: Демьян Борисович Кудрявцев; born 17 December 1971) is a Russian media manager and entrepreneur. Formerly a close associate of Boris Berezovsky, he is a general manager at the Kommersant publishing house, and an owner of the Vedomosti newspaper.

== Biography ==
Demyan Kudryavtsev was born in Leningrad, USSR in 1971. He studied journalism at Leningrad State University and obtained a second degree in philology from the Hebrew University of Jerusalem after repatriating to Israel in 1990. He acquired Israeli citizenship and finished military service in the country. He launched some business projects in Israel, including an IP telephony startup (Deltathree), but ultimately decided to return to Russia and invest his time in information technologies there.

In 1995, Kudryavtsev became a co-founder and executive of Cityline ISP and the head of its content-focused arm Netskate. In the early times of Runet, he took part in the launch of some popular websites, such as the Anekdot.ru jokes website and The Evening Internet media. In 2001, Cityline was sold to its major rival Golden Telecom and Kudryavtsev received $2.9 million for his share.

During that time, Kudryavtsev was introduced to Boris Berezovsky, who became Cityline co-owner in 1998. Kudryavtsev gained his trust and essentially became his right-hand man, a personal press secretary, and an advisor. He drafted the 1999 Russian legislative election campaign for the Unity political party and was a speechwriter for Vladimir Putin in the 2000 Russian presidential election. He also managed Berezovsky's media assets, such as the Kommersant newspaper and the ORT TV channel. When Berezovsky ran into conflict with Putin, Kudryavtsev set up the deal to sell ORT to Roman Abramovich and followed Berezovsky to London.

In the following years, Kudryavtsev assisted Berezovsky in his political initiatives. For instance, he represented his interests in Kyiv during the 2004 Ukrainian presidential election and led the advisory group that helped Kurmanbek Bakiev win the 2005 Kyrgyz presidential election, which followed the Tulip Revolution. In Kyrgyzstan, Kudriavtsev became a minor shareholder in the gold mining company and earned $3.5 million from selling his share several years later.

== Media ==
=== Kommersant ===
In 2005, Kudryavtsev assisted Berezovsky in the management shake-up of Kommersant newspaper and invited Vladislav Boroulin as the chief editor. In early 2006, Kudryavtsev became the director general of Kommersant Publishing House. Soon he negotiated the newspaper sale to Alisher Usmanov for up to $280 million, earning 1% of that sum for his assistance. Despite his connections to Berezovsky, Kudryavtsev kept his position until 2012. He split the online edition of Kommersant into a separate project and launched the Kommersant FM radio station. Yet Kommersant TV channel and Citizen K magazine, which he started, never turned a profit and were shut down soon after his departure from Kommersant.

Starting in 2007, Kommersant (and specifically the Kommersant-Vlast magazine) came under pressure from the authorities for publications on sensitive political topics. The conflict reached its height during the 2011 Russian legislative election and led to the departure of Kommersant-Vlast chief editor. In 2012, Kudryavtsev also quit the company and was replaced by Dmitry Sergeev, former CEO of UTV Media. According to Meduza, that happened due to pressure from Alexey Gromov, a top Presidential Administration official acting as media curator, who demanded the resignation of a Kommersant top executive. Kudryavtsev received $3 million in compensation for resignation.

=== Vedomosti ===
Starting in 2013, Kudryavtsev and his business partners Vladimir Voronov and Martin Pompadout (both affiliated with Rupert Murdoch's News Corporation) negotiated with Sanoma about purchasing its Russian assets. The bundle in question included a 33.3% share in Vedomosti newspaper, The Moscow Times, and the Russian edition of the Season, Men's Health, Women's Health, National Geographic, and the Harvard Business Review magazines. The deal was signed in May 2015, shortly after the Russian authorities adopted a law effectively banning foreign control of media in Russia. Kudryavtsev also acquired the priority right to purchase the remaining shares of Vedomosti from Pearson (the publisher of Financial Times) and Dow Jones (the publisher of The Wall Street Journal). By the end of 2015, he became the full owner of Vedomosti.

The joint investigation of Forbes, Meduza, The Bell, and Vedomosti found out that the deal was made with the Gazprombank debt, and the rights on that debt were later transferred to the Rosneft-owned Russian Regional Development Bank. The loan was arranged by Kudryavtsev's friend Dmitry Bosov. The investigators questioned if the state-owned Rosneft influenced the managerial decisions of Kudryavtsev. The entrepreneur had denied allegations, pointing out that he never interfered with the editorial politics and that during his ownership of Vedomosti, the newspaper was targeted by several lawsuits from Rosneft, while he personally was stripped out of his Russian citizenship and effectively chased out of the country. In May 2020, Kudryavtsev sold Vedomosti to Ivan Yeremin (FederalPress) and Kostantin Zyatkov (Versia).

=== The Moscow Times ===
After acquiring The Moscow Times, Kudryavtsev invited Yuri Saprykin and Mikhail Fishman to lead the editorial team and relaunched the newspaper as a weekly print publication. Later in 2017, the founder of the newspaper Derk Sauer joined the management team and turned it into an online-only project.

== Publishing ==
During his time in Israel, Kudryavtsev published an Inhabited Island literature magazine and an online magazine EYE. Together with Anton Nosik, they published an unofficial humor supplement for a popular weekly Israeli-Russian newspaper Vremia. Upon returning to Russia, Kudryavtsev published The Internet magazine and Ai literature journal. Kudryavtsev also made a name as a poet, both in Russia and Israel.
