= Dmitri Sergeyev =

Dmitri Sergeyev may refer to:

- Dmitri Sergeyev (judoka), Russian judoka
- Dmitry Sergeyev (footballer), Russian footballer
- Dmitry Sergeev (businessman), Russian entrepreneur and executive
