= Alexander Butyagin =

Russian archaeologist and classics scholar

- Александр Бутягин
- Born: October 12, 1971 (age 54); Leningrad, Russian SFSR, Soviet Union
- Citizenship: Russia
- Education: Leningrad State University
- Known for: archeological research of the Northern Black Sea Region
- Scientific career
- Fields: Archaeology
- Workplaces: State Hermitage Museum
- Thesis: Construction complexes of archaic Myrmekion (1993)

External image
- Alexander Butyagin

Alexander Mikhailovich Butyagin (Russian: Александр Михайлович Бутягин; born October 12, 1971) is a Russian archaeologist and classical scholar, a Candidate of Historical Sciences, and a science communicator. He is the head of the Sector of Archaeology of the Northern Black Sea region in the Department of the Ancient World at the State Hermitage Museum. Since 1999, he has served as the head of the Myrmekion Archaeological Expedition, which studies the ruins of the ancient (Greek, then Bosporan and Roman) city of Myrmekion in present-day Kerch.

In December 2025, Butyagin was detained in Poland at Ukraine's request due to accusations of conducting archaeological excavations in Crimea after 2014 without permission from Ukrainian authorities. In March 2026, he was ordered by the Warsaw District Court to be extradited to Ukraine to stand trial. On April 28, Butyagin was released as part of a prisoner exchange.

== Biography ==
Butyagin was born in 1971 in Leningrad. From 1978 to 1988 he studied at School No. 67 with an advanced curriculum in the Spanish language. In 1985 he joined an archaeology club at the Leningrad Palace of Pioneers (now the St. Petersburg City Palace of Youth Creativity). In 1988 he entered the Department of Archaeology of the Faculty of History at Leningrad State University (LGU). He graduated in 1993 with honors, defending a thesis entitled Construction complexes of archaic Myrmekion.

His research interests include the Bosporus in the Archaic and Classical periods, military affairs in the Northern Black Sea region, and methodological issues at the intersection of art history and archaeology in the study of ancient societies. He is the author of more than 150 scholarly works. At various times he has participated in numerous Russian and international academic conferences.

Since 1993, he has taught at the School Centre of the State Hermitage Museum. On 1 February 1993 he began working in the Hermitage's Department of the Ancient World as a laboratory assistant, and since 1994 as a research associate. Since 2005 he has been head of the Sector of Archaeology of the Northern Black Sea region in the Department of the Ancient World of the Hermitage. He is the executive secretary of the Archaeological Commission and a member of the Academic Council of the State Hermitage Museum. He is also a member of the Multimedia Activities Commission and a member of the International Council of Museums. He serves as curator of the collection of archaeological finds from the smaller cities of the Bosporus (Myrmekion, Iluraton, Tyritake, Porphmion) and from ancient-period kurgans of the Kerch Peninsula.

He is an assistant at the Department of Archaeology of Saint Petersburg State University. He teaches courses on classical archaeology, as well as a seminar and courses on current issues in modern classical archaeology. At the Department of Art History he taught courses on the art history of the Ancient Near East and on classical art. He also taught at the Department of Art History of the Higher Religious-Philosophical School, offering courses on the art history of Antiquity and the Ancient Near East, fundamentals of archaeology, and museum studies.

In 2009 he organized the exhibition The Mystery of the Golden Mask. In 2010 he published a book of poems entitled Burial of Unclaimed Ashes. From 2010 to 2022 he headed an expedition excavating villas at Stabiae near Naples. For the educational website Arzamas he prepared a series of lectures devoted to the history of Antiquity and related topics. Together with the Saint Petersburg "Lev Lurie's House of Culture", he organized author-led tours of the Hermitage and lecture meetings.

In 2024–25, he acted as curator of the Hermitage exhibition "Look into the Eyes of Monsters": Mythical embodiments of terror in Antiquity and their victors. A scholarly catalogue was published for the exhibition.

=== Myrmekion Archaeological Expedition ===
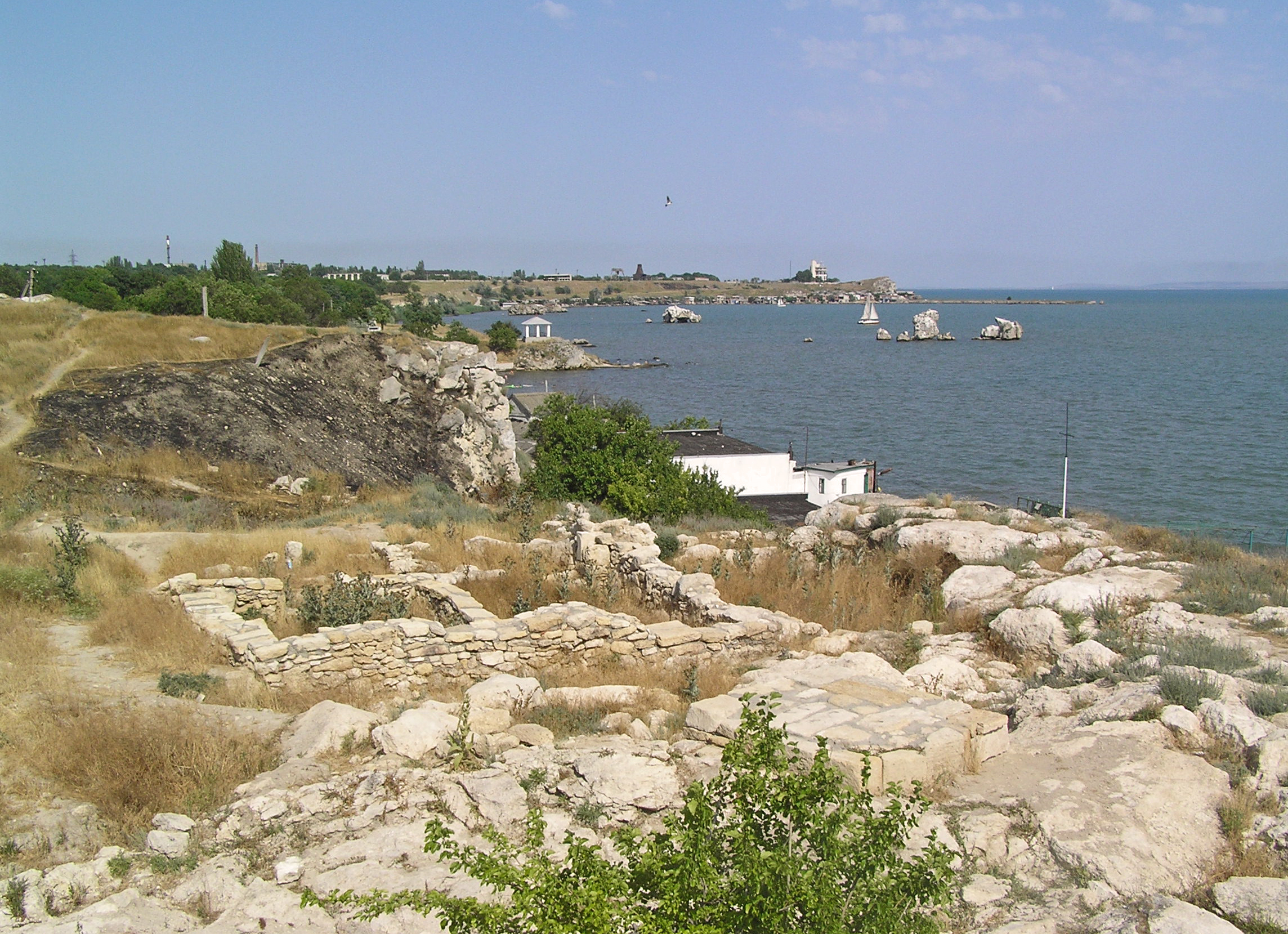
The ancient Greek settlement site of Myrmekion at Cape Karantynny. Photograph, 2007.

Since 1999, Butyagin has led the Myrmekion Archaeological Expedition. Over the course of its work, the expedition uncovered buildings from the Archaic, Classical and Hellenistic periods of ancient Greek history and from the Roman period; it also investigated a later medieval necropolis dated to the 13th–14th centuries.

In 2002, Butyagin's expedition found the hoard of 723 bronze coins of Panticapaeum (3rd century BCE), and in 2003 it found the hoard of 99 electrum coins from Cyzicus. In 2006, the Hermitage organized an exhibition entitled Myrmekion, which displayed some of the finds. A catalogue entitled Myrmekion in the light of the latest archaeological research was published for the exhibition; in a joint article with historian Yury Vinogradov, the archaeology of Myrmekion was described in detail.

The fieldwork begun in 1999 continued after the annexation of Crimea by Russia in 2014. Ukraine considers all excavations conducted in Crimea from 2014 onward to be unlawful, including those carried out by local Crimean archaeologists, if they were not authorized by an official Ukrainian permit under the applicable Ukrainian legal regime.

In 2022, the Myrmekion expedition discovered a hoard of gold coins. According to reporting, a risk of looting by illegal treasure hunters ("black diggers") arose, aggravated by the fact that the ruins of Myrmekion lie within the city limits of Kerch.

=== Arrest in Poland ===
In 2024, Ukrainian prosecutors reported that Butyagin had been notified in absentia of suspicion of unlawful excavations, damage to a cultural heritage site, and causing damage estimated at more than 200 million hryvnias, under Part 4 of Article 298 of the Criminal Code of Ukraine ("illegal search work at an archaeological heritage site; destruction, ruin or damage to cultural heritage objects"). The accusations were based on the international cultural heritage law that prohibits any archaeological excavations on occupied territories unless explicitly authorized and permitted by the internationally recognized authorities.

According to the Kharkiv Human Rights Group, Russia had violated said law by excavating, 'renovating', and causing other irreparable damage to places of Crimean Tatar or Ukrainian cultural heritage in Crimea, such as Bakhchysarai Palace or the Ancient City of Tauric Chersonese and its Chora. In March 2025, Ukraine's Main Directorate of Intelligence (HUR) stated that "hundreds of archaeological artifacts discovered during excavations" had been removed from Crimea, including from the ancient city of Panticapaeum, where Butyagin also carried out archaeological work.

Meanwhile, Vadim Mayko, director of the Institute of Archaeology of Crimea (Russian Academy of Sciences), said in an interview with a Russian outlet that all objects found by Butyagin, both before and after 2014, were transferred for storage to Crimean museums, and that items taken to Saint Petersburg or Moscow were transported only for necessary restoration and always returned thereafter. The claim that the finds were not removed from Crimea for permanent storage was also mentioned in Meduza's reporting on Butyagin's arrest, citing historian and journalist Arseny Vesnin.

On 4 December 2025, Butyagin was detained in Warsaw at Ukraine's request. He had entered Poland without obstruction shortly before and was expected to give a public lecture there. After questioning, a court ordered his detention for 40 days. According to information cited from Butyagin's colleagues, Ukrainian authorities opened criminal cases against all archaeologists who worked in Crimea after Russia's annexation of the peninsula.

In response, the Hermitage issued a statement asserting that finds made during the excavations were not removed from Crimea and were recorded on the balance sheet of the East Crimean Historical and Cultural Museum-Reserve (this institution brings together a number of museums and archaeological sites in Kerch, including the archaeological site of the Myrmekion settlement) After his detention, a number of Russian opposition figures voiced support for Butyagin, including the historian and journalist Arseny Vesnin and the former Russian media manager Demyan Kudryavtsev.

Against the backdrop of Butyagin's arrest, Russia's Ministry of Education and Science recommended that universities and research institutes coordinate all foreign business trips to unfriendly countries in advance.

In March 2026, Butyagin was ordered by the Warsaw District Court to be extradited to Ukraine to stand trial. On April 28, Butyagin was released as part of a prisoner exchange between Poland and Belarus.

== Bibliography ==
=== Books ===
- Aleksinsky, D. P. (2005). Всадники войны. Кавалерия Европы [Riders of War: The Cavalry of Europe] (in Russian). Klim A. Zhukov; Alexander M. Butyagin; D. S. Korovkin. Moscow; Saint Petersburg: Полигон; АСТ. p. 488. ISBN 5-17-027891-8.
- Butyagin, A. M. (2015). На земле грифона [On the Land of the Griffin] (in Russian). O. Yu. Sokolova; S. L. Solovyov. Saint Petersburg: Изд-во Гос. Эрмитажа. p. 38. ISBN 978-5-93572-626-3.
- Butyagin, A. M. (2019). Помпеи, Геркуланум, Оплонтис, Стабии: краткий очерк истории и археологии [Pompeii, Herculaneum, Oplontis, Stabiae: a short overview of history and archaeology] (in Russian). Saint Petersburg: Изд-во Гос. Эрмитажа. p. 91. ISBN 978-5-93572-851-9.
- «Посмотри в глаза чудовищ»: мифические олицетворения ужаса в Античности и их победители: каталог выставки (Санкт-Петербург, Государственный Эрмитаж) (in Russian). Saint Petersburg: Изд-во Гос. Эрмитажа. 2024. p. 403. ISBN 978-5-907653-77-1.

=== Selected articles ===
- Butyagin, A. M. (2004). "Клады античного Мирмекия" [Hoard finds from ancient Myrmekion]. Сообщения Государственного Эрмитажа (in Russian). LXII. Saint Petersburg: Издательство Государственного Эрмитажа: 86–91. ISBN 5-93572-142-2.
- Butyagin, A. M. (2004). "Кизикины: античная валюта Понта" [Cyzicenes: an ancient currency of Pontus] (PDF). Мирмекийский клад. Новые открытия на Боспоре Эрмитажной археологической экспедиции [The Myrmekion hoard: new discoveries on the Bosporus by the Hermitage archaeological expedition] (Exhibition catalogue) (in Russian). Saint Petersburg: Издательство Государственного Эрмитажа. pp. 12–15. ISBN 5-93572-143-0.
- Butyagin, A. M. (2004). "Клады кизикинов и Мирмекийский клад" [Hoard finds of Cyzicenes and the Myrmekion hoard] (PDF). Мирмекийский клад. Новые открытия на Боспоре Эрмитажной археологической экспедиции [The Myrmekion hoard: new discoveries on the Bosporus by the Hermitage archaeological expedition] (Exhibition catalogue) (in Russian). Saint Petersburg: Издательство Государственного Эрмитажа. pp. 17–21. ISBN 5-93572-143-0.
- Butyagin, A. M. (2004). "Дом под мирмекийскими зольниками" [A house beneath the Myrmekion ash mounds]. Боспорский феномен: проблемы хронологии и датировки памятников [The Bosporan phenomenon: problems of chronology and dating of sites] (Proceedings of an international conference) (in Russian). Vol. I. Saint Petersburg: Издательство Государственного Эрмитажа. pp. 126–131. ISBN 5-93572-116-3.
- Butyagin, A. M. (2005). "К интерпретации зольников Мирмекия (свидетельства Павсания и боспорская культовая практика)" [On interpreting the Myrmekion ash mounds (Pausanias' testimony and Bosporan cult practice)] (PDF). Боспорский феномен: проблема соотношения письменных и археологических источников [The Bosporan phenomenon: the problem of correlating written and archaeological sources] (Proceedings of an international conference) (in Russian). Saint Petersburg: Издательство Государственного Эрмитажа. pp. 101–107. ISBN 5-93572-194-5.
- Butyagin, A. M. (2005-11-27). "Хранители и грабители (вопросы взаимоотношений)" [Guardians and looters (issues of relations)]. «Археология России» (archaeology.ru) (in Russian). Archived from the original on 2009-09-20.
- Butyagin, A. M.; Chistov, D. E. (2006). "The Hoard of Cyzicenes and Shrine of Demeter at Myrmekion". Ancient Civilizations from Scythia to Siberia. 12 (1–2). Leiden: 77–132. ISSN 0929-077X.
- Butyagin, A. M.; Treister, M. Yu. (2010). "Бронзовая ольпа Мирмекийского клада" [The bronze olpe of the Myrmekion hoard]. Античный мир и археология (in Russian) (14). Saratov: Научная книга: 238–246. ISSN 0320-961X.
- Bekhter, A. P.; Butyagin, A. M. (2018). "Остракон из раскопок Мирмекия 2012 г." [An ostracon from the 2012 Myrmekion excavations]. Боспорские исследования (in Russian).
- Smekalova, T. N.; Butyagin, A. M.; Pasumansky, A. E.; Trubnikova, E. D. (2019). "Рентгено-флуоресцентный анализ состава сплава монет Боспора эпохи денежного кризиса III в. до н.э. (по материалам клада 2002 г. из Мирмекия)" [X-ray fluorescence analysis of the alloy composition of Bosporan coins from the 3rd century BCE monetary crisis (based on the 2002 hoard from Myrmekion)] (PDF). Древности Боспора (in Russian). 24. Moscow: Институт археологии РАН: 512–524. ISBN 978-5-94375-287-2.
- Smekalova, T. N.; Bykovskaya, N. V.; Butyagin, A. M.; Pasumansky, A. E. (2019). "Новые данные для изучения кризиса III в. до н.э." [New data for studying the 3rd century BCE crisis] (PDF). In Zinko, V. N.; Zinko, E. A. (eds.). Боспор Киммерийский и варварский мир в период античности и средневековья. Основные итоги и перспективы исследований. XX Боспорские чтения [The Cimmerian Bosporus and the barbarian world in Antiquity and the Middle Ages: results and research prospects. 20th Bosporan Readings] (Proceedings of an international conference) (in Russian). Simferopol; Kerch: ИП Кифниди Г. И. pp. 528–533. ISBN 978-5-6040450-5-3.

=== Popular-science materials ===
- Alexander Butyagin. Lecturer page on Arzamas.
