= Myrmēkion =

Ancient Greek colony in Crimea

Coordinates: 45°21′12″N 36°31′21″E

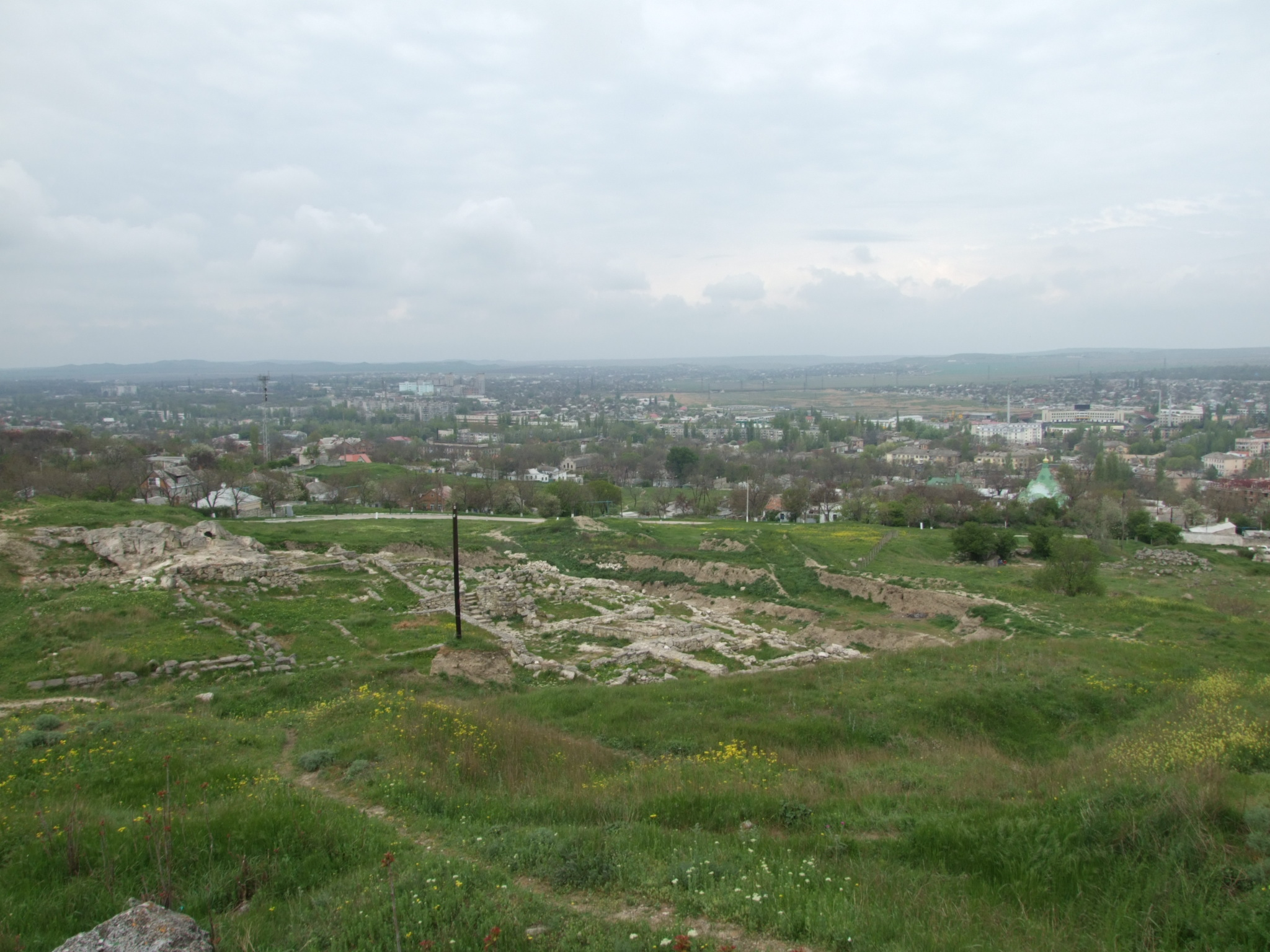
- Myrmekion
- Interactive map of Myrmēkion

Immovable Monument of National Significance of Ukraine
- Official name: Археологічний комплекс "Стародавнє місто Мірмекій" (Archaeological complex of the Ancient city of Myrmekion)
- Type: Archaeology
- Reference no.: 010015-Н

Myrmēkion or Myrmecium (Ancient Greek: Μυρμήκιον, Ukrainian: Мірмекій, Russian: Мирмекий) was an ancient Greek colony in Crimea. The settlement was founded in the eastern part of the modern city of Kerch, 4 km NE of ancient Panticapaeum on the bank of Kerch Bay near the Karantinny Cape. The settlement was founded by Milesians in the first half of the 6th century BC.

According to Strabo, it was 20 stadia from Panticapeum, and 40 stadia from Parthenium and opposite to it was the town of Achilleum. Near the town was a promontory of the same name.

It was in the place of modern Yeni-Kale and many ancient remains have been found.

In the 5th century BC, the town specialized in winemaking and minted its own coinage. It was surrounded by towered walls, measuring some 2.5 metres thick. Myrmekion fell into the hands of the Bosporan kings in the 4th century BC and gradually dwindled into insignificance in the shadow of their capital, Panticapaeum. Regular excavations began in 1934 undertaken by an expedition led by V.F. Gaidukevich. The site was excavated by Polish archaeologists, led by Kazimierz Michałowski, in the 1950s. Between 1982 and 1994 an expedition led by Yu.A. Vinogradov was working at the site. In 1999 an archaeological expedition of the State Hermitage Museum began work at the site.

== Name ==
There are two versions of the origin of the city’s name. The first derives it from the Greek root "myrmex" ("ant"). The second associates the name with a Greek word meaning "underwater reef".

Information about Myrmekion has been preserved in ancient manuscripts. Periplus of Pseudo-Scylax (4th century BC), describing the coasts of eastern Crimea, names Myrmekion among the most important cities of the region (Theodosia, Nymphaeum, Panticapaeum), whereas Strabo refers to it sometimes as a "town" and sometimes as a "village".

== History ==
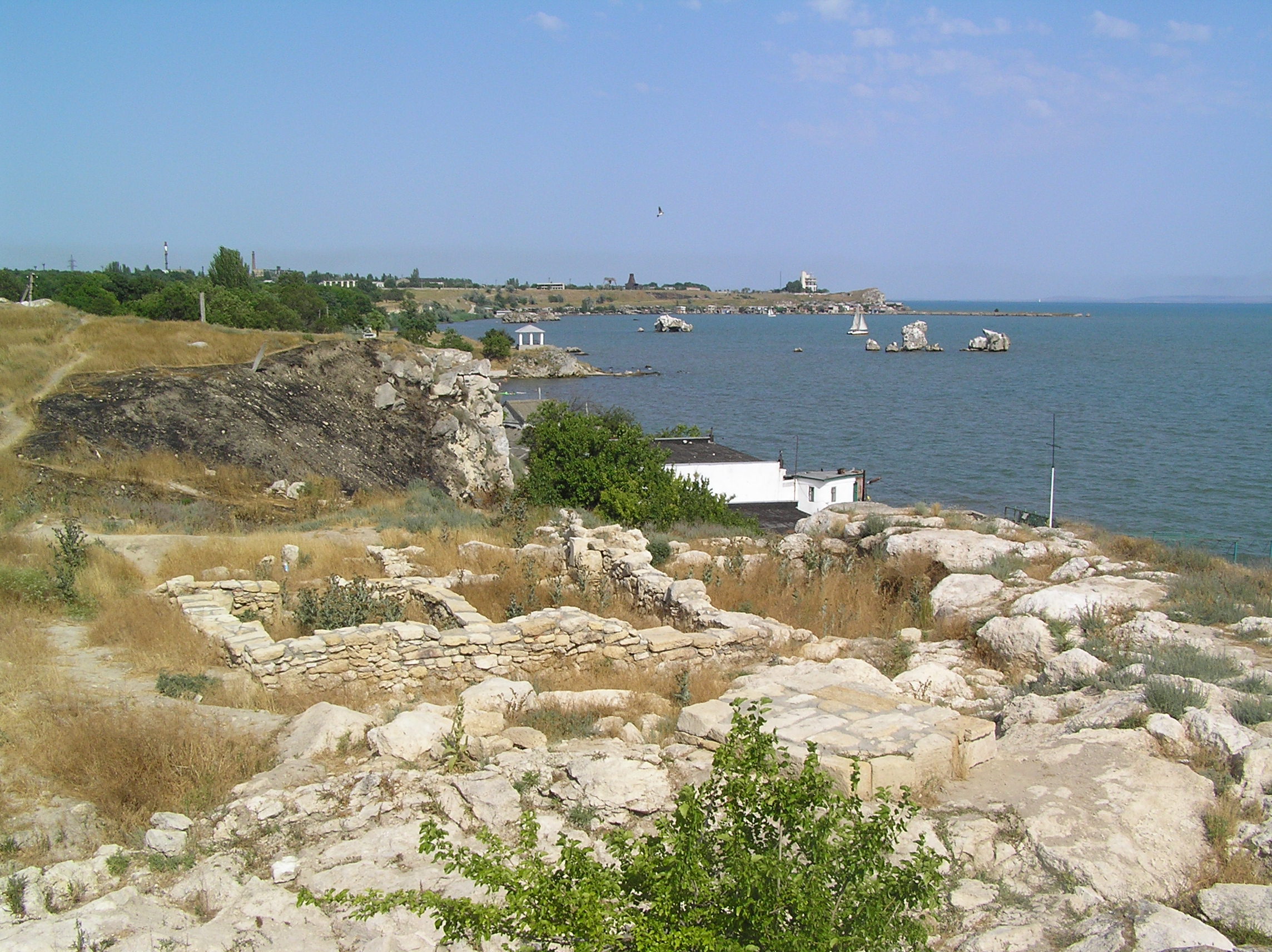

=== Ancient period ===
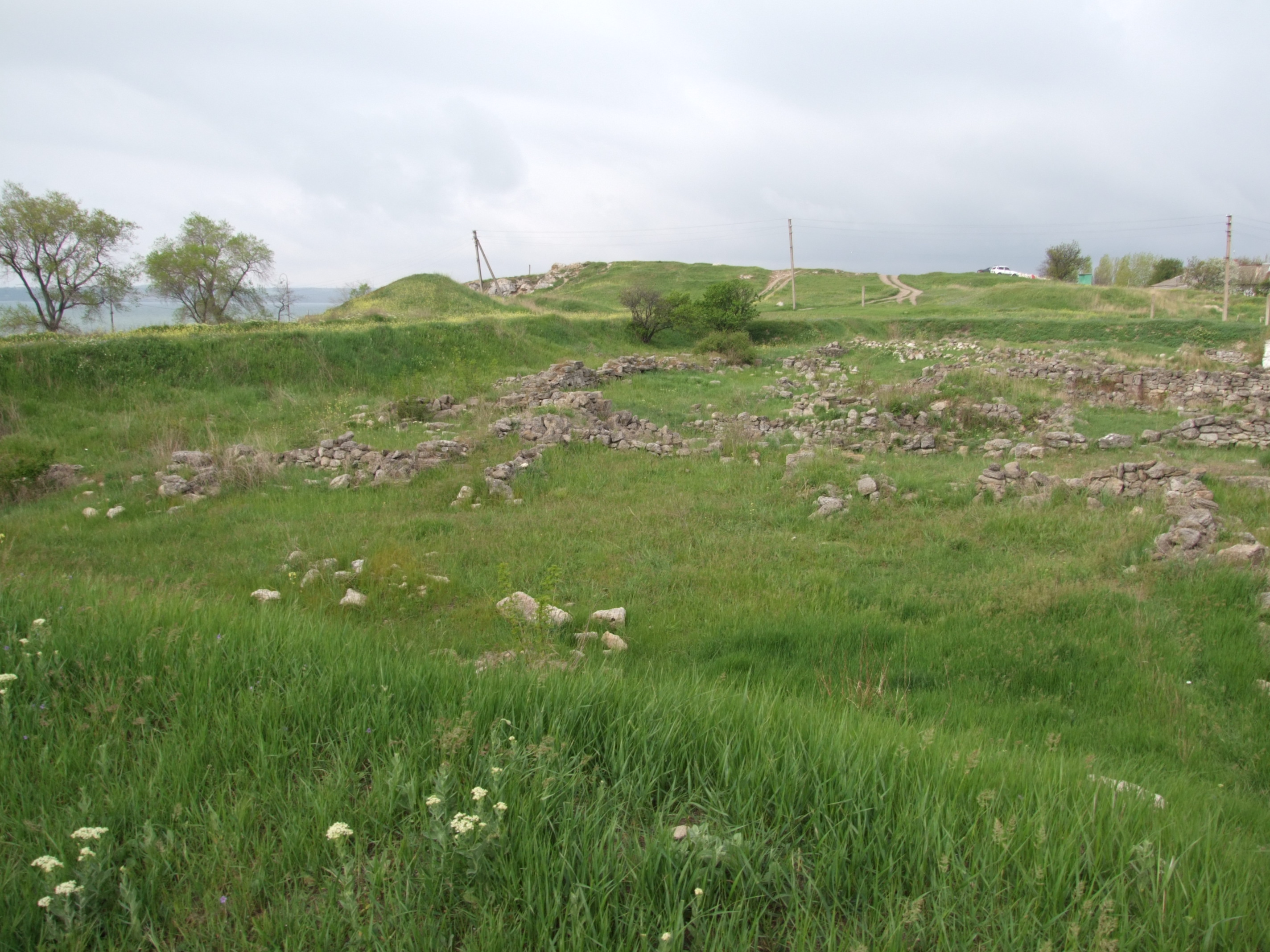
Archaeological complex "Ancient city of Myrmekiy"

Myrmekion was founded at the boundary of the 1st and 2nd quarters of the 6th century BC. The metropolis is unknown, though researchers assume it may have been Miletus. According to S. O. Zhebelev, the city was named after its founder. Yu. O. Vinogradov, however, linked the name to the rocks protruding into the strait near Myrmekion.

The population lived in small semi-dugout dwellings with roofs made of dried seaweed, built only in the area of the small rocky Cape Quarantine and along the shore of the bay to the west. In the mid-6th century BC, the city suffered a major fire. Soon afterward, a defensive wall was built around the acropolis (a similar one was discovered at Porthmion). The city became one of the two earliest Greek colonies in the northern Black Sea region. At the beginning of the 5th century BC, the city expanded to 6–7 ha and was built up with large above-ground houses.

At the end of the first third of the 5th century BC, the city was destroyed, most likely as a result of a Scythian attack. Its territory shrank more than fourfold, and a new defensive wall was erected over the former quarters, in which arrowheads were found. After the mid-5th century BC, life in the city revived, reaching its peak in the first half of the 4th century BC. At that time, the city again had continuous development. A temple and public buildings were probably located here; around the mid-4th century BC they were again destroyed by fire. The city was then surrounded by a new defensive wall that fully protected it from attack. The maximum area of the ancient settlement reached 7–8 ha.

The city experienced another flourishing in the 3rd–2nd centuries BC: during this time a unique object appeared — a stone mound over 3 m high located within the city. Its emergence was probably connected with a nearby sanctuary.

For a long time, Myrmekion did not have independent significance and was presumably a settlement belonging to a member of the Bosporan royal family.

In the mid-1st century BC, Myrmekion perished during the civil strife that unfolded in the Bosporan Kingdom after the death of Mithridates VI Eupator. Life at the site revived in the first half of the 1st century AD, when Myrmekion consisted of several large estates. Around the mid-2nd century AD, they were destroyed, and a huge royal tomb of a Bosporan king (possibly Tiberius Julius Eupator) was built on the cape, in which the Myrmekion Sarcophagus was found in 1834. After some time, Myrmekion was again built up with estates.

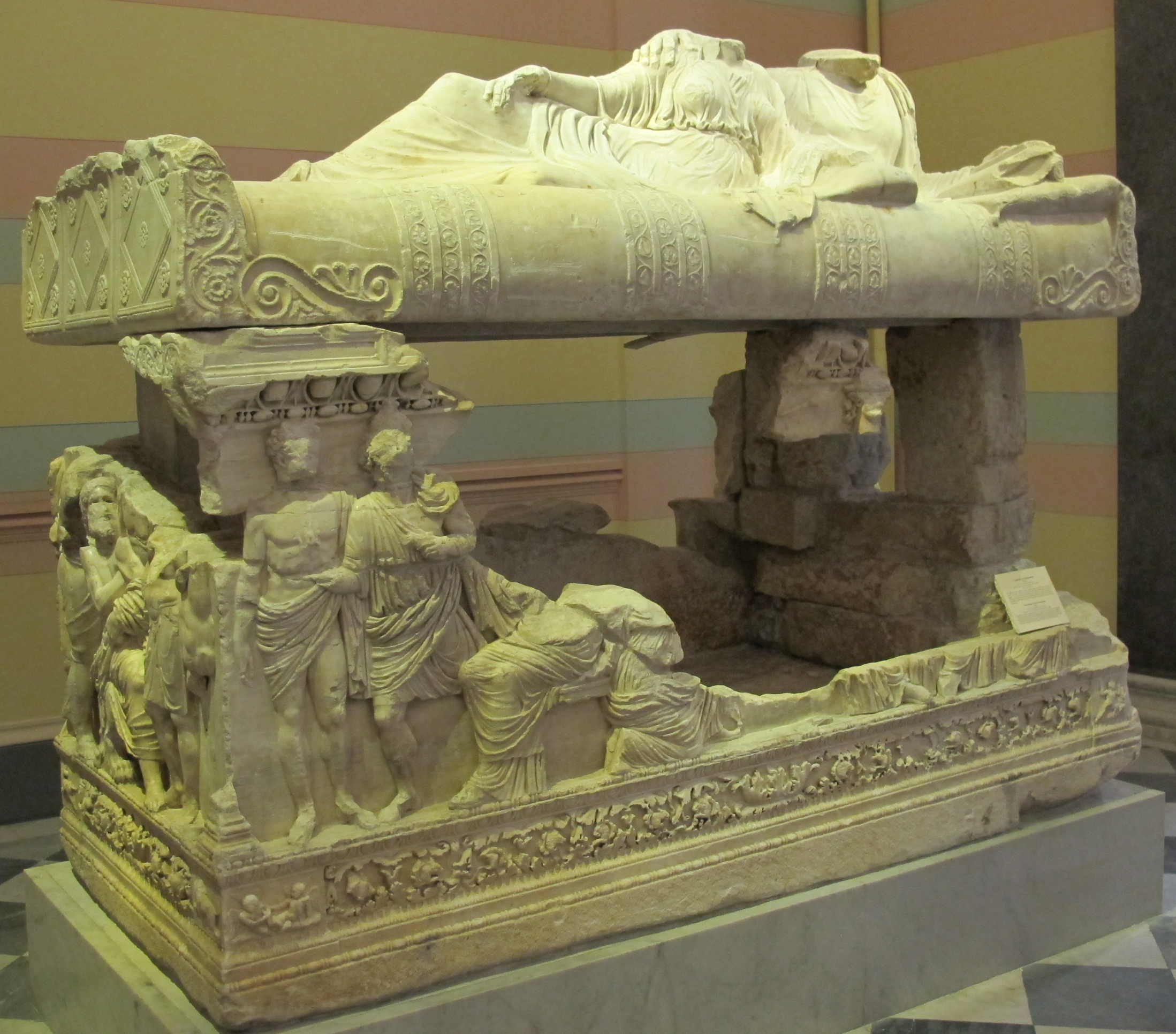
Sarcophagus from Myrmekion, Attica, 150-200 AD.

From the Hellenistic period, Myrmekion is known as an ancient center of winemaking. The wineries consisted of rooms with two (less often three) platforms for treading grapes by foot and pressing the remaining juice using a stone press. Juice of uneven quality flowed into separate compartments of cisterns, whose capacity reached 7–8 thousand liters. Archaeological excavations also revealed Roman-period fish-salting vats.

=== Early Middle Ages ===
From the mid-3rd century, Goths entered the territory of the Bosporan Kingdom. Urban development became irregular. Buildings consisted of separate, sometimes fortified, estates.

In the 380s, the Bosporan Kingdom, which included Myrmekion, fell under the invasion of the Huns. By the 4th century, Myrmekion ceased to exist: its inhabitants moved under the protection of Panticapaeum. In the 8th–9th centuries, a settlement of the Saltovo-Mayaki culture existed on the site, which ceased to exist in the 10th century.

=== Genoese period ===
After the Mongol conquest of Crimea and its inclusion in the Golden Horde, settlements near the Kerch Strait became transit points of the Silk Road, as a result of which small settlements arose on the site of the ancient city in the 13th–14th centuries. During the reign of Khan Uzbeg, the emir of Solkhat transferred Bosporus to the Venetians in exchange for the payment of a trade duty, but as a result of the Venetian–Genoese war of 1350–1356, Bosporus passed into Genoese possession. A settlement known in Genoese sources as Pondico arose on the site of Myrmekion.

Of interest are the remains of a small fortress of the 14th–15th centuries discovered on the very edge of Cape Quarantine. The fortress was fortified by a wall (2.6 m wide) and a ditch. Residential and economic buildings were located along the inner side of the wall; all of them burned down in a fire.

== Archaeological study of the Myrmekion settlement ==
The plan of the settlement was recorded in 1820 by the enthusiast of classical archaeology Paul Du Brux, one of the founders of the Kerch Museum of Antiquities. In 1834, the first major discovery at Myrmekion occurred: quarantine guard sailors, while installing a flag mast, discovered tombs cut into the rock of the Myrmekion acropolis and found two marble sarcophagi. One of them — a shattered huge marble sarcophagus with relief scenes from the life of Achilles — has no analogues in the world (currently in the collection of the Russian Hermitage); fragments of its walls, lower part, and lid have survived. It is assumed that the sarcophagus was produced in the 2nd century AD in one of the Athenian workshops.

Systematic excavations at Myrmekion began only in 1934. In 2002 the Hellenistic Myrmekion Hoard (2002) was discovered.

=== Research and expeditions ===
- 1863 — O. Yu. Lutsenko, director of the Kerch Museum of Antiquities; 1883, 1885–1889 — F. I. Gross, director of the Kerch Museum of Antiquities;
- 1903, 1906 — V. V. Shkorpil, director of the Kerch Museum of Antiquities;
- 1934–1938, 1946–1950, 1956–1966 — work of the Bosporan Expedition of the Institute of the History of Material Culture (later the Leningrad Branch of the Institute of Archaeology) of the USSR Academy of Sciences under the leadership of V. F. Gaidukevich;
- 1956–1958 — Soviet-Polish expedition led by V. F. Gaidukevich and Kazimierz Michałowski;
- 1982–1994 — excavations by the Myrmekion detachment of the Bosporan Expedition of the Leningrad Branch of the Institute of Archaeology of the USSR Academy of Sciences (later the Institute of the History of Material Culture of the Russian Academy of Sciences) under the leadership of Yu. O. Vinogradov;
- 1999 — joint expedition of the IHMC RAS and the State Hermitage (Saint Petersburg, Russia);
- since 2000 — excavations conducted by the Myrmekion Expedition of the State Hermitage headed by O. M. Butyagin.

== After the Russian occupation of Crimea ==
After the Russian occupation of Crimea in February–March 2014, work at the settlement has been carried out by the Russian side in violation of Ukrainian legislation. By decree of the Government of the Russian Federation No. 2073-r of 17 October 2015, the Myrmekion settlement was included in the Unified State Register of Cultural Heritage Objects.

In August 2015, a limestone slab with a multi-line inscription was discovered on the northern part of the settlement near the rock of Cape Quarantine. The text is the most extensive ever found at Myrmekion. The slab, measuring 49 cm in length, 25 cm in width, and 20 cm in thickness, was embedded in masonry with the inscription facing inward. The approximate date of the inscription is the late 1st century BC to early 1st century AD. The find was transferred to the lapidarium of the "East Crimean Historical and Cultural Museum-Reserve" in Kerch.

In 2017, a new necropolis was discovered at Myrmekion. In the same year, in an undisturbed layer of the second half of the 4th century BC beneath the southern wall of a Roman-period estate, a lead opisthographic letter dated to the last quarter of the 4th century BC was found; its orthography demonstrates the transition from the Ionic dialect to Koine. The text is a private business letter; the sender likely specialized in transit trade of high-quality clothing. The uniqueness of the monument lies in the fact that two letters intended for different recipients are placed on a single rectangular plate with rounded edges measuring 2.8–3.8 × 10.8 cm.

From 31 July to 20 August 2017, the Hermitage leadership together with O. Butyagin organized the "Southern Expedition" at Myrmekion, involving Hermitage staff, students and faculty of Saint Petersburg State University, students of the Higher School of Economics (Perm, Russia), students from France, and volunteers (about 90 people in total).

In late summer 2018, it became known that the first large statue in the history of excavations at Myrmekion had been discovered: the sculpture was found in the collapse of a destroyed estate of the 2nd century AD. It was determined that the headless and legless statue, 1.15 m tall and weighing nearly 110 kg, represents the ancient Greek god of medicine Asclepius (Aesculapius in Roman mythology). The sculpture was transferred to the "East Crimean Historical and Cultural Museum-Reserve". In addition to the statue, a bone figurine of Mercury, a fragment of a sculptural relief, and many bronze coins were found.

On 17 August 2019, it was reported that a burial from the first wave of Greek colonization of Crimea, dated to the second half of the 6th century BC, was discovered in the Myrmekion necropolis. Unusual was the first opened tomb of small size (approximately 70 × 40 cm), which turned out to be empty: it had been carved from a single block of stone. It is assumed that the burial may have been symbolic, or that ashes were buried there.

In December 2025 the head of the excavations Alexander Butyagin was arrested in Poland for the illegal excavations. His extradition to Ukraine was approved in March 2026.

== See also ==
- List of ancient Greek cities
