= Vedomosti =

Russian business-focused daily broadsheet newspaper based in Moscow

- Type: Daily newspaper
- Format: Broadsheet
- Owner: Oleg Leonov
- Founder: Derk Sauer (1952-2025)
- Editor-in-chief: Irina Kazmina
- Founded: 1999; 27 years ago
- Language: Russian
- Headquarters: Moscow
- Country: Russia
- Circulation: 64,680
- ISSN: 1814-3881 (print); 1727-7345 (web)
- Website: www.vedomosti.ru

Vedomosti (Russian: Ведомости, IPA: [ˈvʲedəməsʲtʲɪ], lit. 'The Record') is a Russian-language business daily newspaper published in Moscow.

== History ==
Vedomosti was founded in 1999 as a joint venture between Dow Jones, who publishes The Wall Street Journal; Pearson, who previously published the Financial Times; and Independent Media, who publishes The Moscow Times. Independent Media was acquired by Finnish media company Sanoma in 2005.

Leonid Bereshidsky was the first chief editor, till he entered INSEAD business school in 2002 and was replaced by Tatiana Lysova. From 2007 till 2010, Yelizaveta Osetinskaya served as chief editor. In 2010, she became chief editor of the online version of the newspaper. She was replaced by former chief editor Tatiana Lysova.

Sanoma sold its stake in the paper to Demyan Kudryavtsev, former chief executive of Kommersant, in April 2015. Ahead of a new Russian media ownership law prohibiting foreign enterprises from owning more than 20% of Russian media companies, Dow Jones and Pearson also divested their stakes in 2015 to Kudryavtsev, who held the right of first refusal. According to the newspaper, Vedmosti had about twenty-thousand paid subscribers in November 2016. Ilya Bulavinov, former head of the directorate for internet broadcasting of the state First Channel, has been serving as chief editor since 2017.

In March 2020, Kudryavtsev and his partners, Boris Berezovsky associate Vladimir Voronov and former News Corp executive Martin Pompadour, announced their intention to sell Vedomosti to two buyers: publisher of Nasha Versiya Konstantin Zyatkov and managing director of Arbat Capital Alexei Golubovich. Former editor-in-chief Tatiana Lysova criticized the sale, saying that the buyers were "alien to Vedomosti's rules and ideals."

The following month, the sale was put on hold amid accusations of censorship under editor-in-chief Andrey Shmarov. Shmarov reportedly deleted articles critical of Rosneft's head, Igor Sechin, and banned articles critical of Putin's proposed constitutional changes. According to an investigation by Meduza, Arkan Investment, Vedomostis parent company, had taken out a loan of €28 million from Rosneft's subsidiary the Russian Regional Development Bank (RRDB) to pay off a previous €25 million loan from the Russian state-owned bank Gazprombank which was used to buy Vedomosti in 2015. The investigation also alleged that Rosneft spokesperson Mikhail Leontyev was involved in both the selection of Shmarov as editor-in-chief and in negotiating the sale of the paper. Kudryavtsev confirmed the loan, but claims the loan was not used to buy Vedomosti.

On 29 May 2020, Vedomosti was sold to businessman Ivan Yeremin via his holding company Sapport.

On 15 June 2020, five senior editors resigned from Vedomosti in protest to Shmarov's confirmation to editor-in-chief by the paper's board of directors. Some of them established an independent VTimes news website. Russia designated VTimes as a "foreign agent" in May 2021, saying it was registered in the Netherlands; on 3 June 2021, VTimes announced closure of its operations on 12 June, citing operational difficulties connected with the status.

In 2022, the formal ownership of Vedomosti was transferred to Oleg Leonov, a PR advisor and former head of the FTI Consulting office in Moscow.

== Criticism ==
In July 2016 Vedomosti published an article about Igor Sechin, the head of Rosneft. According to the article Sechin was building a house in Barvikha on a plot worth $60 million. In November of the same year, Sechin won the case against Vedomosti and the court ordered the newspaper to remove the material from the newspaper's website and destroy all available circulation of this article.
