= Myrmekion Hoard (2002) =

Myrmekion hoard (2002) is a coin hoard discovered in 2002 by an archaeological expedition of the State Hermitage Museum led by Alexander Butyagin at the ancient settlement site of Myrmekion within the city limits of Kerch (the Kerch Peninsula, Crimea). It consisted of 722 or 723 (the number varies between sources) copper-alloy coins minted in Panticapaeum. The obverse depicts the head of a satyr, while the reverse shows a bow, an arrow, and the inscription "ΠΑΝ". The hoard contained both overstruck specimens (a smaller part) and specimens struck on new coin flans (the larger part).

The hoard was discovered in an ash mound near the cliff of the Myrmekion acropolis, where it had been concealed around the middle of the 3rd century BCE. It is among the largest coin assemblages of the monetary-crisis period in the Bosporan Kingdom, whose territory included Panticapaeum and Myrmekion. This crisis erupted in the first half of the 3rd century BCE and was associated with the decline of the Bosporan grain trade, primarily with Athens. The set of coins found at Myrmekion reflects the peak stage of the crisis, when the copper-alloy coinage deteriorated in several ways at once: coin weight fell sharply while the nominal value remained the same; the quality of striking declined substantially; and a debasement of the coinage occurred, in which the proportion of lead in the alloy was noticeably increased to cheapen it.

== Circumstances of discovery ==
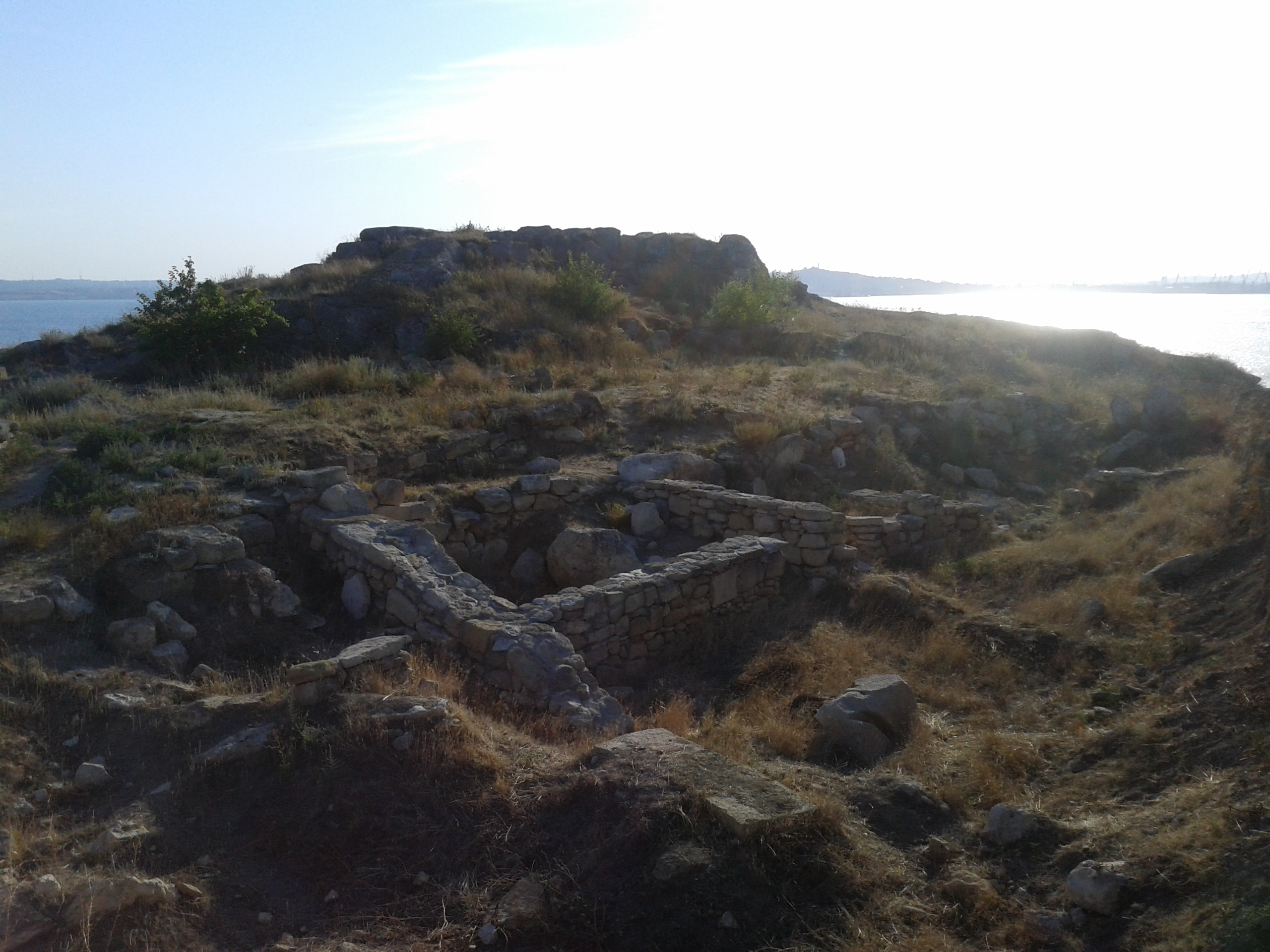
The acropolis of Myrmekion

In 2002, the Myrmekion Archaeological Expedition of the State Hermitage Museum, working under the direction of Alexander Butyagin at the ancient settlement site of Myrmekion (Karantinny Cape in Kerch Bay, on the shore of the Kerch Strait, which connects the Black Sea and the Sea of Azov, now within Kerch), discovered a hoard of coins. It was found at a shallow depth in a fissure in the rock in area "C" of the excavation, in the south-western part of the settlement, by the western foot of the cliff of the Myrmekion acropolis. It was probably originally buried in a small pit in loose soil.

The layer in which the hoard was found consisted of uniform brown or grey loam with inclusions of mussel shells and filled a gully next to the cliff. This layer was excavated by the expedition in 2002–2004, and it also contained admixtures of ash. Apparently, it was a Hellenistic ash mound in use in the 3rd–2nd centuries BCE, with a thickness of at least 4 m, which formed above a large quadrangular building destroyed in the first quarter of the 3rd century BCE.

The 2002 hoard was uncovered in the very upper layers on the eastern side of the ash mound. It has been suggested that it was placed in one of the fissures of the cliff before it was covered by the ash mound, since the hoard is significantly older than the adjacent layers of the 2nd century BCE. A scenario is also possible in which the fissure was closed already in the 3rd century BCE, but these deposits were gradually washed off the rock surface until the crack finally disappeared beneath the ashy soil in the following century.

== Description of the hoard ==
External image
- "The hoard at the moment of discovery".

During its time in the ground, the coins underwent severe corrosion and were compressed into a single concretion, resembling a nut in shape; at the same time, several coins were found separately, at a distance of 5–10 cm from it. Possibly, they were originally placed in a linen or leather bag. The exact number of recovered coins varies between sources: earlier publications state that the hoard consisted of 721 coins, while later works usually speak of 722, or 723. The hoard was transferred to the Kerch State Historical and Cultural Reserve, where restoration was carried out.

The hoard consists of bronze (copper-alloy) coins of Panticapaeum of a single type: on the obverse is a head of a beardless satyr in an ivy wreath, facing left; on the reverse is a bow, beneath it an arrow with the tip facing right, and below the inscription "ΠΑΝ". Based on the features of the coins' striking, the Russian numismatist Nina Frolova distinguished four groups within the assemblage:

External images
- "Some of the best-preserved hoard coins: page 1".
- "Page 2".
- "Page 3".
- "Page 4".
- "Page 5".

- Specimens of the type "satyr head left — bow and arrow right, ΠΑΝ", overstruck from an earlier type of Panticapaeum coins, which had a satyr head in an ivy wreath on the obverse and, on the reverse, a lion head, a sturgeon, and the inscription "ΠΑΝ"; these also bore countermarks: a 12-ray star on the obverse (some sources, apparently in error, speak of an 8-ray star), and a gorytos on the reverse. Dmitry Shelov believed that since overstriking was performed, the two types could have had the same nominal value. (Possibly, it was an obol.) The hoard contains 11 such coins;
- Specimens of the type "satyr head left — bow and arrow right, ΠΑΝ", struck on new, larger metal flans: 86 pieces;
- Specimens of the same type, struck on smaller flans, often with traces of casting sprues: 624 pieces (one coin of this group has an impressed satyr-head image on the reverse, nummus incusum);
- One coin of the type "satyr head left — bow and arrow left, ΠΑΝ", an overstruck specimen.

The hoard coins are preserved to varying degrees. The largest ones (about 20 pieces have a diameter up to 2 cm) are heavily worn. This applies in particular to the overstruck specimens of the first group: the 12-ray star countermark is clearly visible on 6 coins, while the images of the lion head and sturgeon on the reverse are poorly visible. Most of the smaller-diameter coins (down to 1.3–1.2 cm) retained cut-off sprue remnants; in some cases, the spread metal is bent and the striking was done over it. Some specimens, due to careless casting, have an almost rectangular shape. Sharp edges and thin sprue remnants indicate that most of the small-diameter coins were practically not in circulation. The coins' appearance suffered from corrosion, but reliefs are completely unreadable on no more than 1/8 of the hoard coins. One feature was initially interpreted as a countermark in the form of a tripod.

== The hoard and the monetary crisis of the 3rd century BCE ==
External image
- "Coins from the hoard".

Researchers date the Myrmekion hoard (2002) to the second quarter or even to around the middle of the 3rd century BCE, and thus to the monetary crisis that affected, in the first half of the century, all ancient states of the Northern Black Sea region and, in particular, the Bosporan Kingdom, which included Panticapaeum and Myrmekion. There are assessments that the hoard reflects in detail the most important turning point of the Bosporan monetary crisis.

The 2002 find is the largest hoard of the crisis period discovered at Myrmekion, and by number of coins it is comparable to such large coin assemblages as the 1963 hoard from the "Jemete" sovkhoz (725 coins), the 1974 hoard from the "Pravoberezhny" sovkhoz near Temryuk (925 coins), and the 1977 hoard from Anapa (1050 coins), which also belong to the period of the monetary crisis.

=== Outline of the monetary crisis of the 3rd century BCE ===
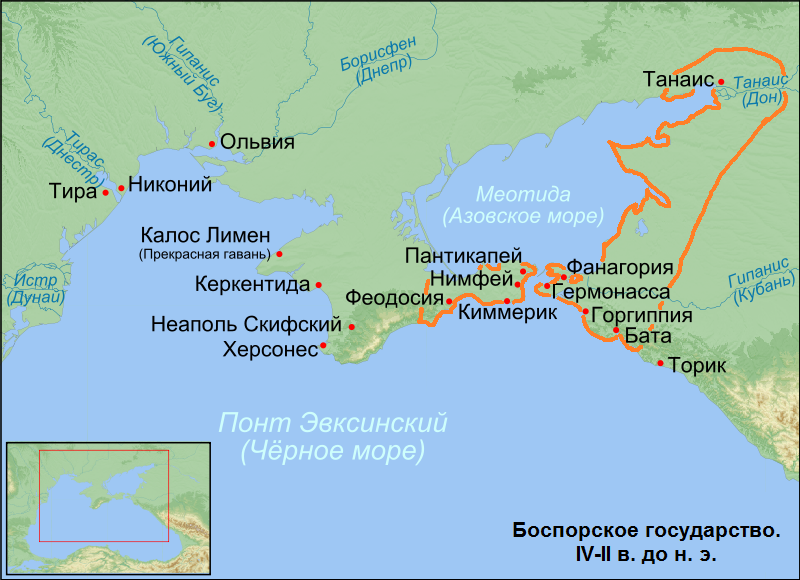
The Bosporan Kingdom at the beginning of the 3rd century BCE

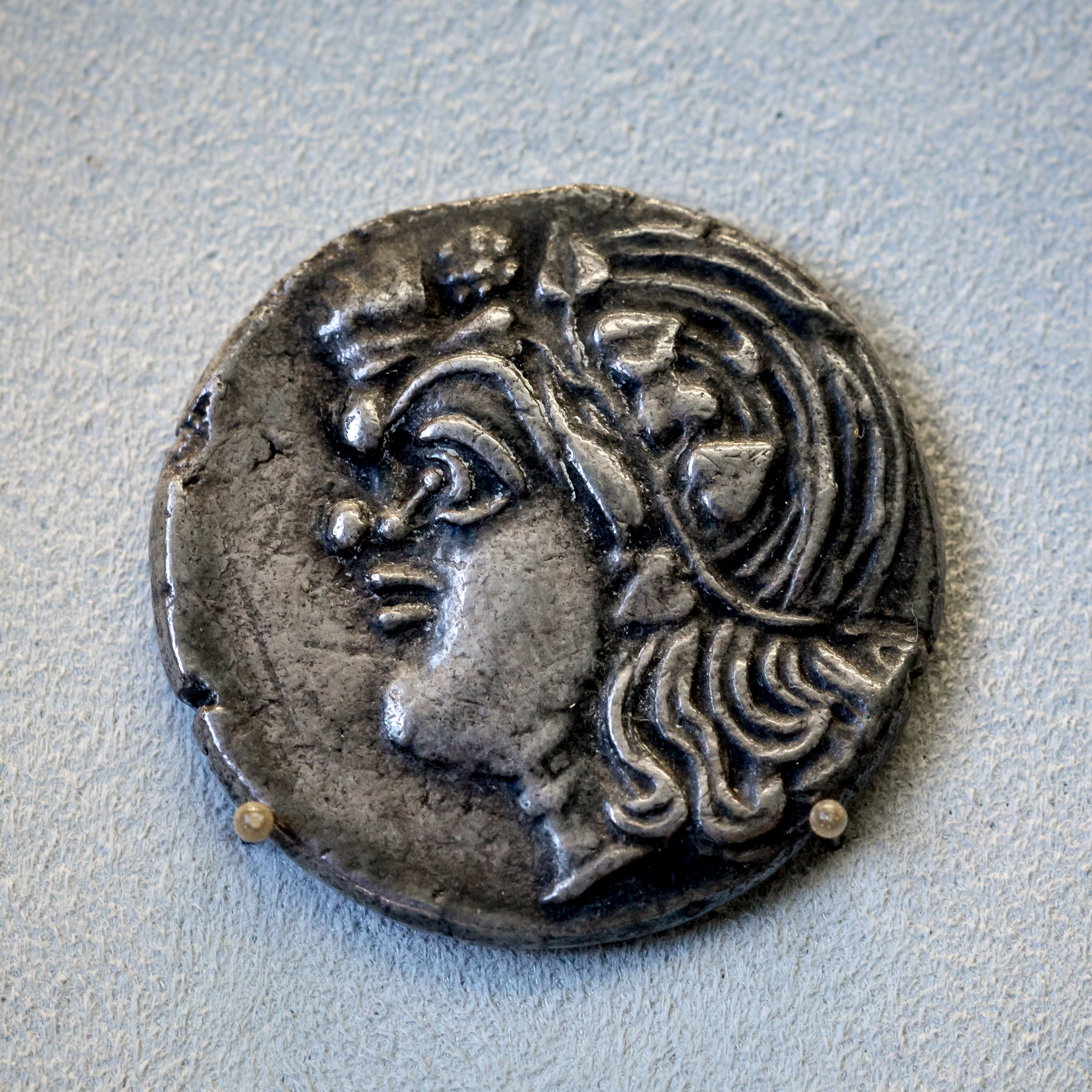
A beardless satyr in an ivy wreath facing left. Silver tridrachm of Panticapaeum, 400–300 BCE, Münzkabinett, Bode Museum, Berlin

In scholarly literature, it has been suggested that by the beginning of the 3rd century BCE the Bosporan Kingdom may have faced a rapid depletion of its own reserves of precious metals and also experienced difficulties obtaining metal feedstock used in coin production from other countries. This was facilitated by the war with the Scythians under King Paerisades I, and then the internecine war among Paerisades' sons—Satyrus II, Prytanis, and Eumelus—for the throne.

The main cause of the monetary crisis is described as a downturn in the grain trade, which played an important role in the Bosporan economy. It was driven by competition from Ptolemaic Kingdom and by the overall decline of Athens, one of the Bosporan Kingdom's principal trading counterparts. As a result, Panticapaeum lost revenue inflows to the treasury. In the 3rd century BCE, the minting of silver coins of the Bosporan coinage ceased, apparently due to a shortage of silver in the state. According to one version, the feedstock for Bosporan minting in the 5th–4th centuries BCE was silver from the Laurion mines, which reached the Northern Black Sea region from Athens in exchange for grain. Thus, it was precisely the cessation of the grain trade with Athens that triggered the financial crisis.

The crisis is thought to have manifested most strongly in the second decade of the reign of Paerisades II, that is, beginning in 275 BCE. Closer to the middle of the 3rd century BCE, coins of a copper alloy came to dominate the Bosporan market—either overstruck from earlier issues or with markedly worsened characteristics compared with earlier coinage. The type "satyr head—bow and arrow" deteriorated both in terms of weight reduction and in terms of declining striking quality. In addition, a debasement of the coinage occurred due to the addition of a large amount of lead to the alloy. By the end of the second quarter of the 3rd century BCE, only a degraded type of copper coin remained on the Bosporan money market. The crisis was overcome under Leucon II in the second half of the 3rd century BCE.

=== The Myrmekion hoard in the chronology of the crisis ===
In the conditional chronology of the monetary crisis proposed by researchers, the Myrmekion hoard characterizes its fourth stage. The predecessor in this sequence is the Anapa hoard of 1882, buried around 270 BCE. It is dominated by overstruck coins; however, all coins of the type “satyr head—bow, arrow, ΠΑΝ” struck on new flans are fairly heavy (4.65–8.65 g). The lightest coin of this type within that hoard weighs 3.39 g (a specimen overstruck from the earlier type).

The Myrmekion hoard contains only one coin with the arrow to the left, whereas the Anapa hoard had 11 such coins. The proportion of overstrikes in the Myrmekion hoard is already small. These coins (the first group in Nina Frolova's classification) were originally issued at the very end of the 4th century or at the beginning of the 3rd century BCE. Their weight ranges from 3.78 to 7.37 g. According to data from an X-ray fluorescence (XRF) analysis of the hoard coins' alloy composition conducted in 2018, the overstruck specimens contain clearly no more than 5% lead and from 1 to 8% tin. This is a normal, good-quality bronze alloy used in Antiquity for small-denomination coins—obols. The overstriking itself was done skillfully.

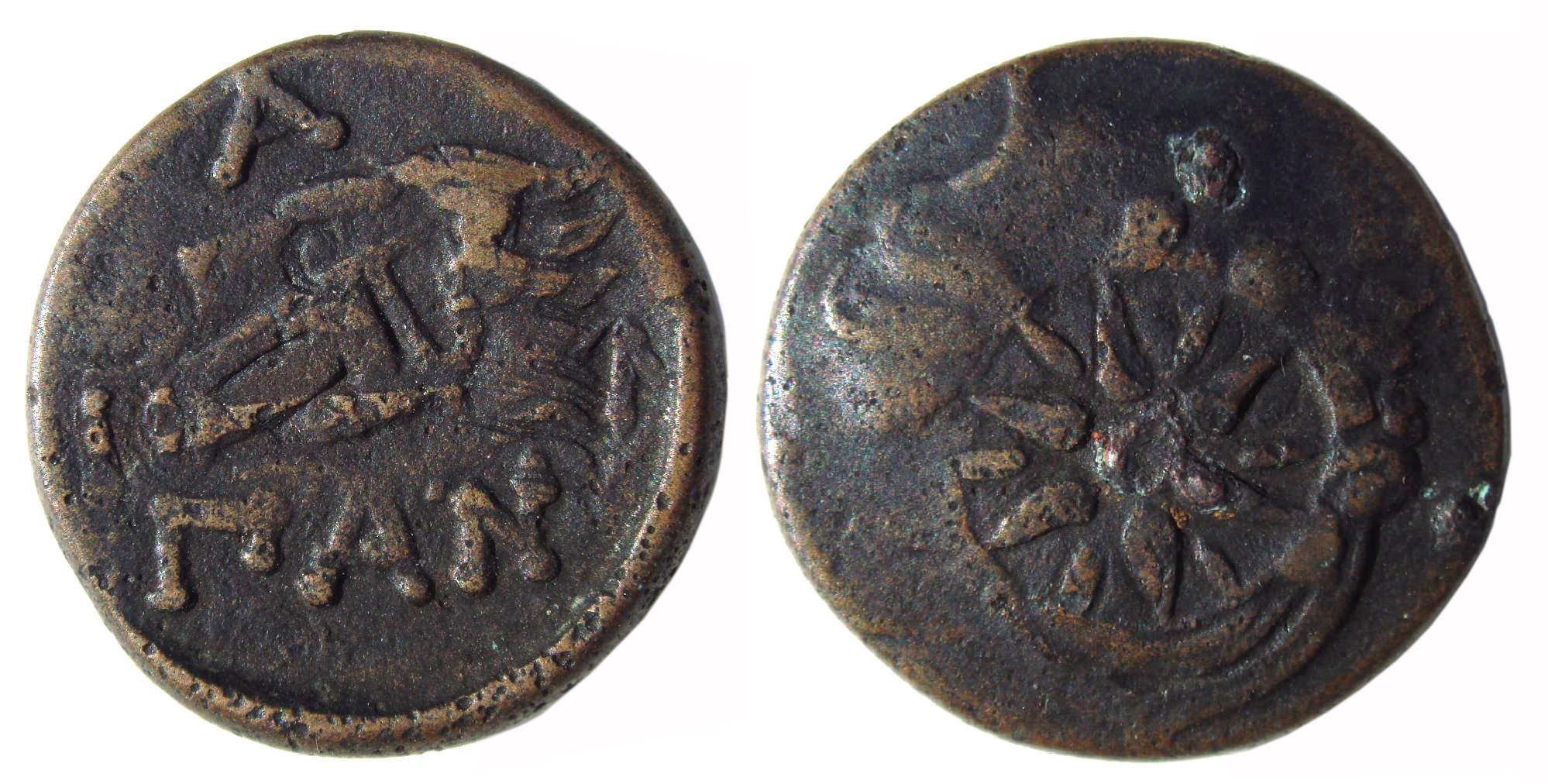
The type "satyr head—lion head, sturgeon" with countermarks: on the obverse a 12-ray star; on the reverse a gorytos. 4th–3rd centuries BCE.

Of the new, large-size coins (minted in the first quarter of the 3rd century BCE), only one coin in the hoard has a diameter of 20 mm and a weight of 7.34 g. Within the entire assemblage, only five new coins fall into the 5 to 7.5 g weight range (although, for the denomination of the types "satyr head—bow and arrow" and "satyr head—lion head, sturgeon", that seems to have been the normal coin weight). The lead content in these specimens clearly cannot exceed 6–7%.

An overwhelming number of the second-group coins were struck on 17–19 mm flans. Aside from the five coins mentioned above, most coins of this group lost almost half their weight (2.73–4.84 g). They are characterized by a sharp rise in lead content: 8% in some specimens, and 26% in one coin. Thus, a transition is observed to minting from a low-grade alloy with an abnormally large amount of lead.

The main part of the 2002 Myrmekion find consists of coins of the third group in Nina Frolova's classification, made in 275–250 BCE from small flans of 12–16 mm and weighing 0.66–2.9 g. Within this group, the Panticapaeum coinage degraded in three ways at once. First, by weight: the coins belong to the same type and denomination as earlier ones but are substantially lighter; some weigh even less than 1 g (possibly minted later than all the others). Second, by striking quality: irregularly shaped blanks were used; the dies were made carelessly; striking was done in haste; traces of trimmed sprues remain; the coin edge is skewed.

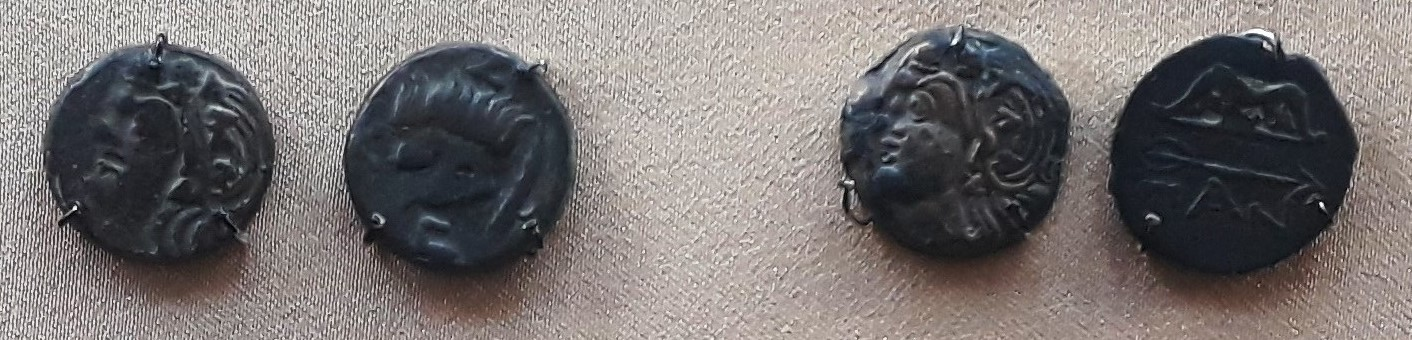
Left: the type “satyr head—lion head, sturgeon”. Right: the type “satyr head—bow, arrow”. National Museum of the History of Ukraine

Third, deterioration of the alloy continued. Coins of the third group contain up to 10% lead, and in some cases even more than 20%. Some specimens, however, still contain only a small amount of this metal. Researchers suggest that these are remelted coins from the beginning of the century, when the lead content had not yet been artificially increased. Lead is a common impurity in coinage; a small share (at the level of a few percent) facilitates casting and striking. At high content, coin quality worsens because lead does not dissolve in copper; the texture of the metal flan suffers and susceptibility to corrosion increases. Increasing the percentage of lead in coins is usually done in order to cheapen the alloy.

The next stages of the Bosporan monetary crisis are illustrated by hoards that contain almost no overstruck coins. In the “Jemete” complex of the mid-3rd century BCE, coins of the degraded type predominate. The hoards from the "Pravoberezhny" state farm and from Anapa (1977) contain, among other things, an already new series "head of Apollo—tripod", issued either in the middle of the century or at the beginning of the last quarter of the 3rd century BCE to normalize monetary circulation, as scholars believe.

== Bibliography ==
- Abramzon, M. G.; Frolova, N. A.; Kulikov, A. V. (2008). "Клад пантикапейских медных монет III в. до н.э. из Мирмекия (2002 г.)" [Hoard of Panticapaeum copper coins of the 3rd century BCE from Myrmekion (2002)]. Российская археология [Russian Archaeology] (in Russian) (1). Moscow: Наука: 73–87. ISSN 0869-6063.
- Butyagin, A. M. (2005). "К интерпретации зольников Мирмекия (свидетельства Павсания и боспорская культовая практика)" [On interpreting the Myrmekion ash mounds (Pausanias’ testimony and Bosporan cult practice)]. Боспорский феномен: проблема соотношения письменных и археологических источников [The Bosporan phenomenon: the problem of correlating written and archaeological sources] (PDF) (Proceedings of an international conference) (in Russian). Saint Petersburg: Издательство Государственного Эрмитажа. pp. 101–107. ISBN 5-93572-194-5.
- Butyagin, A. M. (2004a). "Клады античного Мирмекия" [Hoard finds of ancient Myrmekion]. Сообщения Государственного Эрмитажа [Reports of the State Hermitage Museum] (in Russian). LXII. Saint Petersburg: Издательство Государственного Эрмитажа: 86–91. ISBN 5-93572-142-2.
- Smekalova, T. N.; Butyagin, A. M.; Pasumansky, A. E.; Trubnikova, E. D. (2019). "Рентгено-флуоресцентный анализ состава сплава монет Боспора эпохи денежного кризиса III в. до н.э. (по материалам клада 2002 г. из Мирмекия)" [X-ray fluorescence analysis of the alloy composition of Bosporan coins from the 3rd century BCE monetary crisis (based on the 2002 hoard from Myrmekion)] (PDF). Древности Боспора: Международный ежегодник по истории, археологии, эпиграфике, нумизматике и филологии Боспора Киммерийского [Drevnosti Bospora: International annual on the history, archaeology, epigraphy, numismatics and philology of the Cimmerian Bosporus] (in Russian). 24. Moscow: Институт археологии РАН: 512–524. ISBN 978-5-94375-287-2.
- Smekalova, T. N.; Bykovskaya, N. V.; Butyagin, A. M.; Pasumansky, A. E. (2019). "Новые данные для изучения кризиса III в. до н.э." [New data for studying the 3rd century BCE crisis]. In Zinko, V. N.; Zinko, E. A. (eds.). Боспор Киммерийский и варварский мир в период античности и средневековья. Основные итоги и перспективы исследований. XX Боспорские чтения [The Cimmerian Bosporus and the barbarian world in Antiquity and the Middle Ages: main results and prospects of research. 20th Bosporan Readings] (PDF) (Proceedings of an international conference) (in Russian). Simferopol–Kerch: ИП Кифниди Г. И. pp. 528–533. ISBN 978-5-6040450-5-3.
