= Porthmion =

Ancient Greek city in Crimea

- Πορθμίον (Ancient Greek)
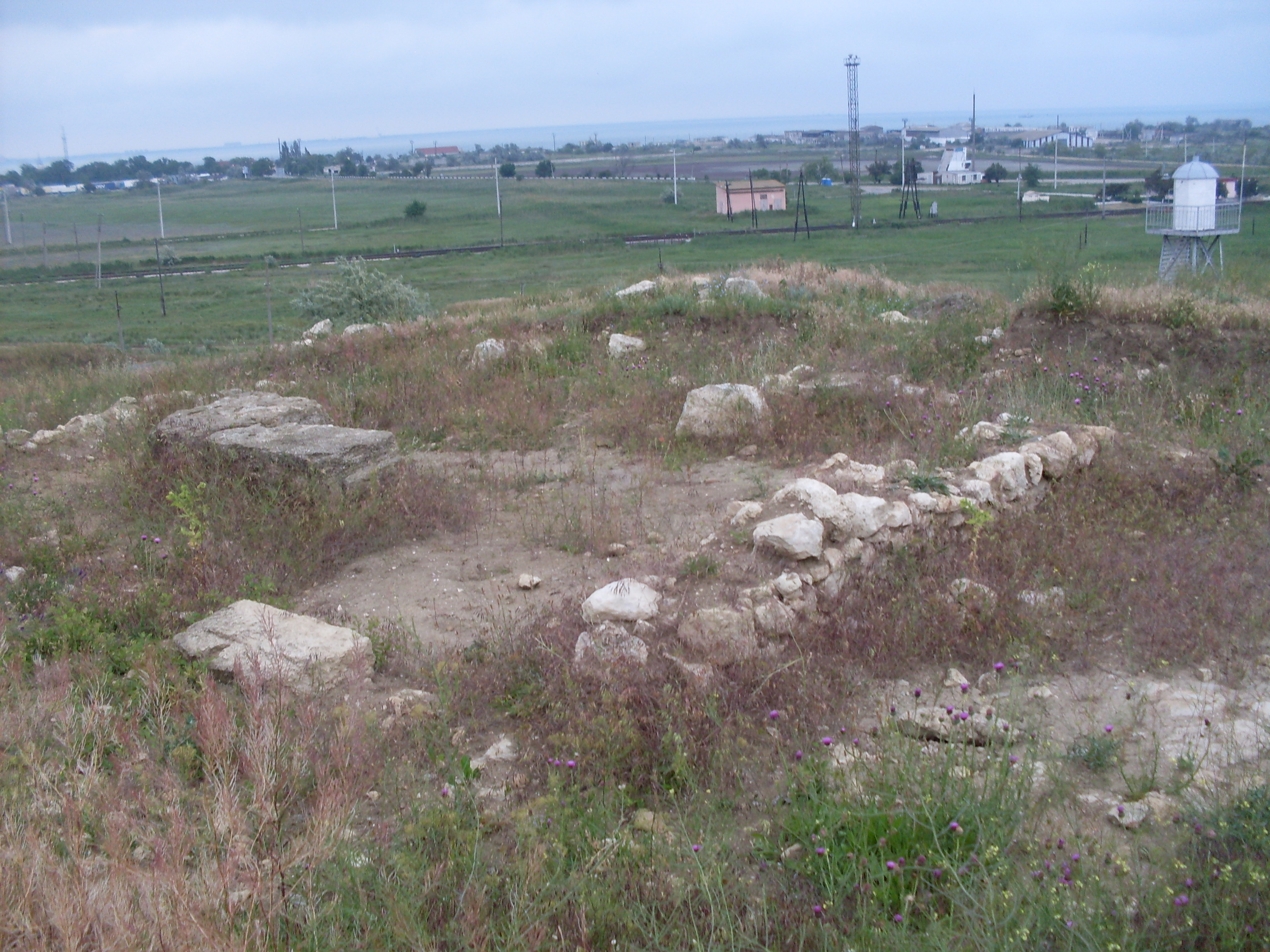
- Interactive map of Porthmion
- 45°22′09″N 36°36′57″E
- Type: Ancient Greek fortified city
- Location: Kerch Peninsula, Crimea
- Region: Northern Black Sea region
- Part of: Bosporan Kingdom, Greek Crimea

History
- Built: Late 6th century BC
- Abandoned: Mid-1st century BC

Site notes
- Material: Limestone, rubble stone, mudbrick
- Area: c. 0.65 ha
- Condition: Ruins

Porthmion (Ancient Greek: Πορθμίον) was an ancient Greek settlement of the Bosporan Kingdom in Crimea. It emerged at the end of the 6th century BC near a ferry crossing and is also an archaeological site preserving the remains of the ancient city, covering an area of about 0.65 hectares. The city existed until the 1st century BC. It was located on the Kerch Peninsula, at the southern foothills of Mount Khroni (Chroni).

== Location ==
The Bosporan city of Porthmion is identified by researchers with the remains of an ancient fortified settlement situated on an elevated rocky plateau near the coast of the Kerch Strait, between the villages of Zhukovka and Nebezpechne (Opasnoye). The settlement lies on an elongated hill approximately 400 m long.

== Research ==
The ancient city was first discovered in 1952 by V. V. Veselov, a local historian and public inspector for monument protection on the Kerch Peninsula. The first excavations were conducted in 1953 by the Bosporan Archaeological Expedition of the Leningrad Branch of the Institute of Archaeology of the USSR Academy of Sciences (now the Institute for the History of Material Culture, Russian Academy of Sciences), under the leadership of V. F. Gaidukevich. In subsequent years, the site was regularly studied by a separate detachment of the same expedition. Until 1985, excavations were led by E. G. Kastanayan.

During the next phase of archaeological research (1986–1990), primary attention was given to layers and structures associated with the early period of Porthmion's existence, as well as surveys of the surrounding area. The third research phase began in 2002 after a hiatus of more than ten years, during which investigations of the Porthmion necropolis were initiated.

== Historical accounts of Porthmion ==
Information about a settlement bearing this name is found in the writings of ancient manuscripts such as Pseudo-Arrian and Stephanus of Byzantium (Ps.-Arr. *Periplus of the Euxine Sea* 69, 70, 117; Steph. Byz., s.v. Πορθμία καὶ Πορθμίον). The origin of the city's name derives transparently from the Greek word πορθμός (“crossing”) and raises no doubts among scholars. Indeed, written and archaeological evidence allows for the reconstruction of one of the traditional crossings of the Kerch Strait in close proximity to the city—an important route that in antiquity connected the Kuban region with Crimea and the wider Northern Black Sea area.

=== Finds from the 6th–5th centuries BC ===
Excavations have shown that the first defensive structures of Porthmion were built shortly after its foundation. The earliest architectural remains, dating to the second half of the 6th century BC through the first third of the 5th century BC, were found mainly in the eastern and southeastern parts of the settlement, covering an area of more than 400 m^{2}.

Traces of archaic fortifications were identified here; these are not only the earliest for this site but also among the earliest known on the Bosporus. The eastern archaic defensive wall was constructed at the most vulnerable approach, where the natural elevation slopes gently. The masonry is irregular and typical for the period. The maximum preserved height of the wall's socle is 1.2 m, with a thickness of 1.0–1.1 m. Based on collapse remains, the upper part of the wall was made of mudbrick.

The southern end of the wall was attached to natural rock outcrops, forming a broken line resembling a bastion. On the inner side of the wall, a drainage channel was built to direct runoff water down the natural slope beyond the settlement. Its remains extend for about 10 m, with a channel depth of up to 0.4 m.

The southern defensive line is preserved more poorly. Here, fortifications ran along the steep southern edge of the plateau and incorporated massive natural limestone blocks. In some places these were roughly shaped, while gaps were filled with smaller stones; in other areas, natural limestone outcrops were “completed” with masonry. This original construction survives only fragmentarily, though its course can be traced clearly for approximately 20 m.

Another fragment of an early defensive wall was discovered during excavations of late Hellenistic residential quarters in the southwestern part of the site. In this case, a section of the archaic wall was reused as part of a later residential building.

At the end of the first phase, around the turn of the 6th–5th centuries BC, Porthmion experienced its first catastrophe: across all areas with archaic remains, clear traces of fire were identified. The burnt layer reaches a thickness of up to 3 cm, and finds from this level show strong heat damage. Near the eastern defensive wall, outside the settlement, small fragments of a human skull were found. Among the finds from this period are a dagger and lekythoi depicting a Scythian holding the reins of two horses.

Following the fires and destruction of the late 6th to early 5th century BC, a new phase began. Buildings appeared that were constructed using techniques known from other Bosporan sites. A large above-ground residential complex of at least nine small rooms was added to the inner (western) side of the eastern defensive wall. The wall socles were built of small limestone stones with ordinary masonry and clay-and-rubble infill; the upper parts were probably mudbrick.

In several rooms, wall masonry is preserved to a height of 0.5–0.7 m. The floor of one room was paved with limestone slabs up to 0.5–0.6 m long and ceramic fragments. The material found in these rooms dates to the last quarter of the 6th century through the first third of the 5th century BC.

A small ash dump (ash mound; zholnik), probably associated with this complex, formed outside the eastern defensive wall about 5 m to the east and contained material dating to the early 5th century BC. Fires and destruction dating to the end of the first third of the 5th century BC recorded at Porthmion have parallels at other European Bosporan sites, reflecting the harsh realities of the Bosporus during this period.

=== Finds from the 3rd–1st centuries BC ===
In the second half of the 3rd century BC, a new city with an area of about half a hectare emerged and existed until the third quarter of the 1st century BC. Its defensive walls, 2.40–2.50 m thick, were built in irregular masonry from large limestone blocks, with gaps filled by rubble stone and clay used as mortar. The walls stood on a rubble foundation.

In the northwestern corner of the fortifications, a rectangular tower measuring 9.75 × 9 m in plan was uncovered. Its walls were built using the same technique as the city walls. The outer (northern) wall of the tower was 2.50 m thick, while the others were 2.25 m thick. An additional outer facing 0.60 m thick reinforced the northern wall. The interior of the tower was paved with stone slabs, and a dog burial was found inside. During excavation, a large number of copper coins minted in Pantikapaion—mostly small denominations—were discovered, suggesting that trade took place here between city inhabitants and surrounding rural settlements.

Excavations reveal a street network. The city was divided into eight rectangular blocks. Three longitudinal streets, each 1.70 m wide, ran east–west across the entire settlement, dividing it into four rows. Three perpendicular lanes, 1.50 m wide, intersected them; the central lane split the city in half. The eastern lane ran along the eastern defensive wall, while the western lane separated residential quarters from rooms attached to the western defensive wall. Block widths were 11 m; western blocks were 42 m long, while eastern ones were slightly longer.

Excavations of residential buildings revealed details of daily life. Hearths enclosed by slabs or flat stones set on edge and coated with clay were found in some rooms, supporting braziers. One room contained a stove made of two dressed shell-limestone blocks with a firebox between them. Nearby was a kitchen table base formed by solid stone masonry (0.45 × 0.45 m in plan, 0.50 m high), likely supporting a wooden tabletop, as well as a stone “feeder” for domestic animals.

In some rooms, partitions interpreted as feeding troughs for livestock were discovered, indicating that animals were kept indoors during cold periods. Other finds include a pithos (preserved only as wall fragments), low slabs possibly used as bench supports or shelves, a portable stone winepress for household wine production, and amphora fragments likely used to drain grape must from the press. In one utility room of a two-room house, a stall or byre for cattle was identified. Several rooms yielded sets of similar items related to women's daily life, including a red-clay balsamarium and loom weights.

Like Iluraton, which arose later, ancient Porthmion was a fortress-city built according to a single plan together with its defensive walls. It is currently the only known monument of this type from the Hellenistic period. The simultaneous planned construction of the city and its fortifications in the second half of the 3rd century BC suggests that the settlement was intentionally established as a fortress to protect the strait crossing. In this case, the population likely consisted mainly of military settlers tasked with defending the approaches to the European territories of the Bosporan Kingdom.

=== Decline ===
Around the middle of the 1st century BC, the city was abandoned and never rebuilt. No evidence of destruction or fire from this period has been identified, indicating that it was simply deserted by its inhabitants. The turbulent period in Bosporan history following the Mithridatic Wars led to political destabilization and, likely, a reorientation of state policy priorities. The abandonment of Porthmion and withdrawal of its garrison coincided with the emergence of a new system of fortified settlements deeper within the peninsula, farther from the coast, such as Iluraton and the fortress at the settlement of Artezian.

== Gallery ==
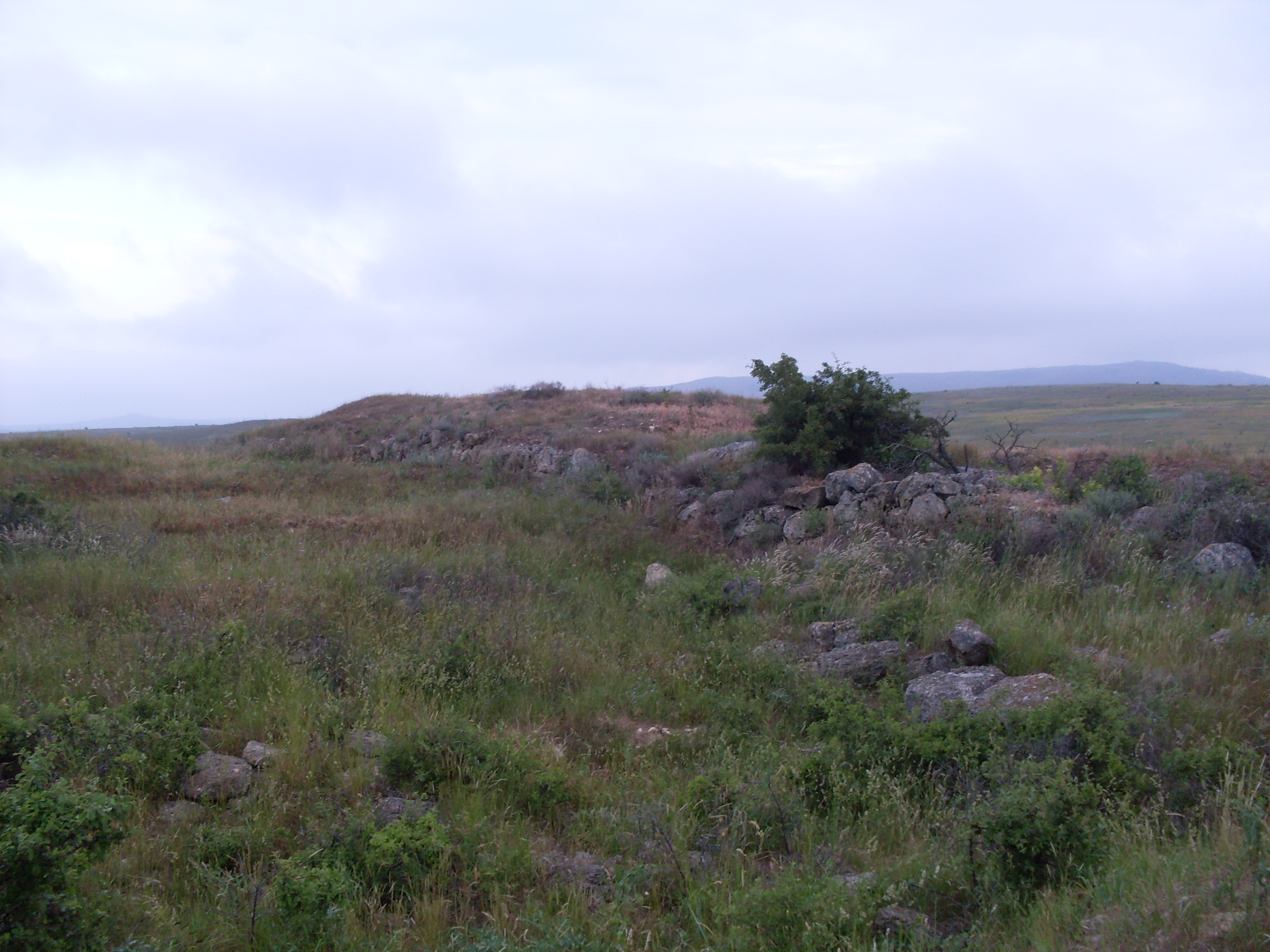

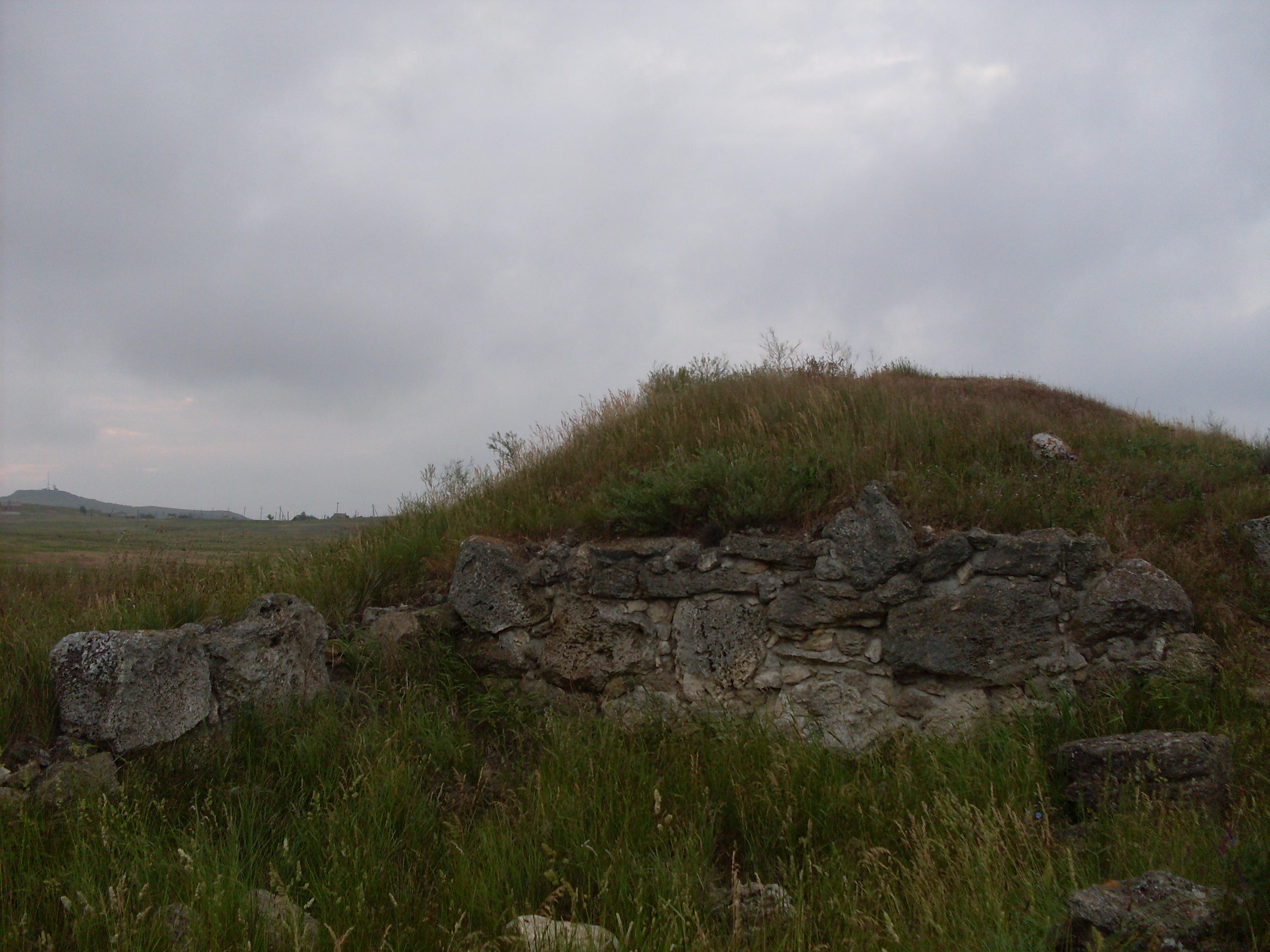

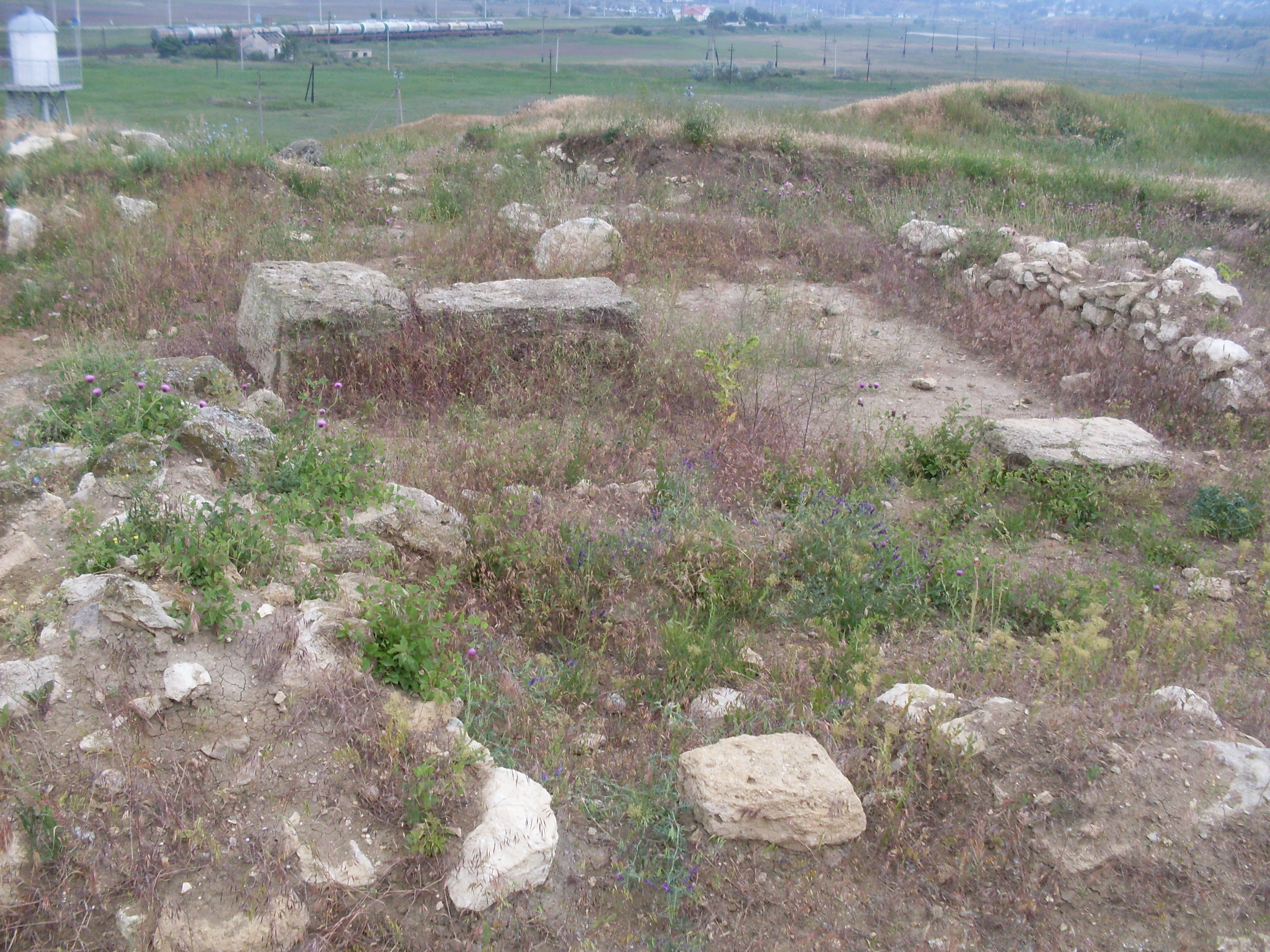

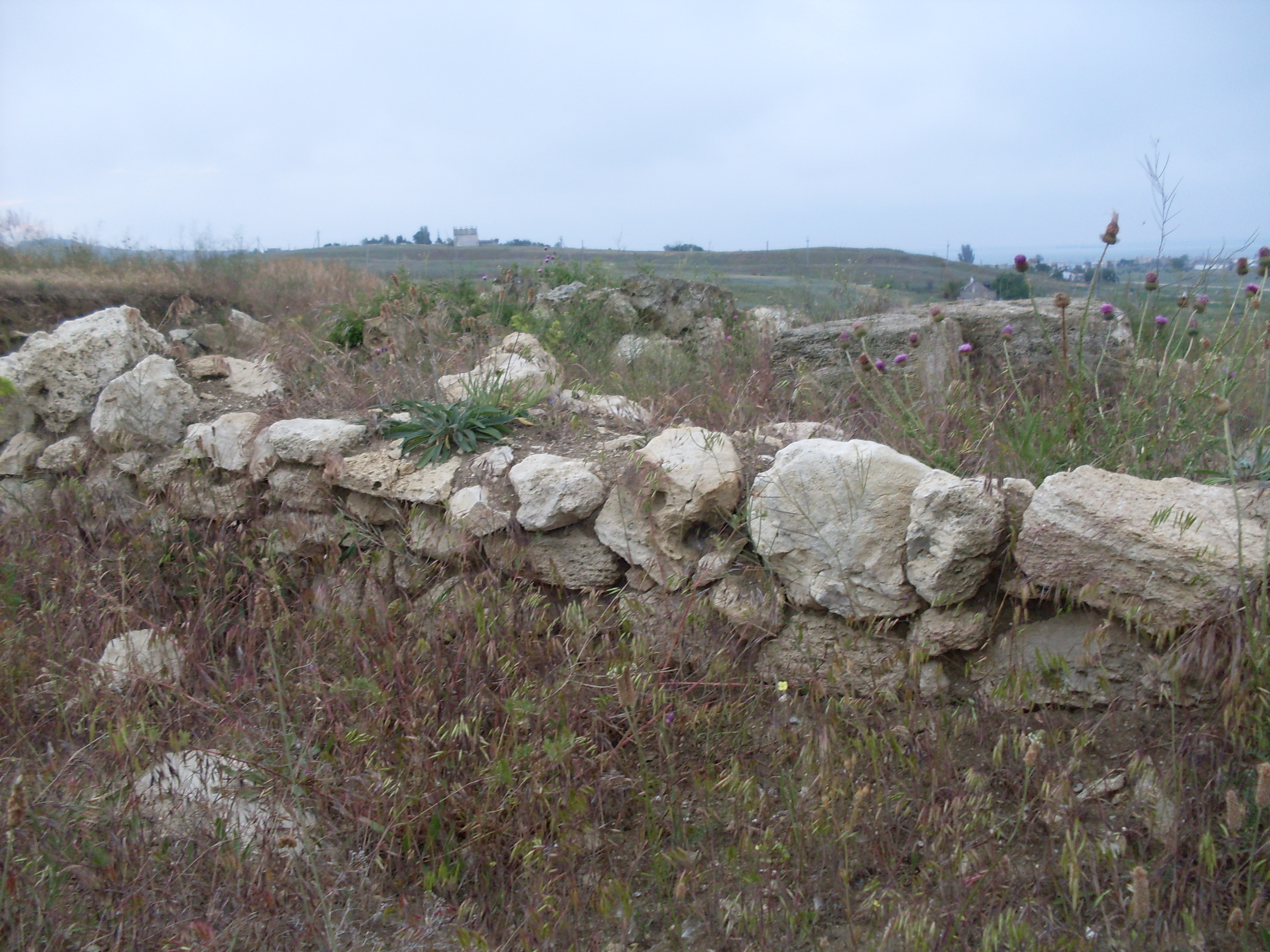

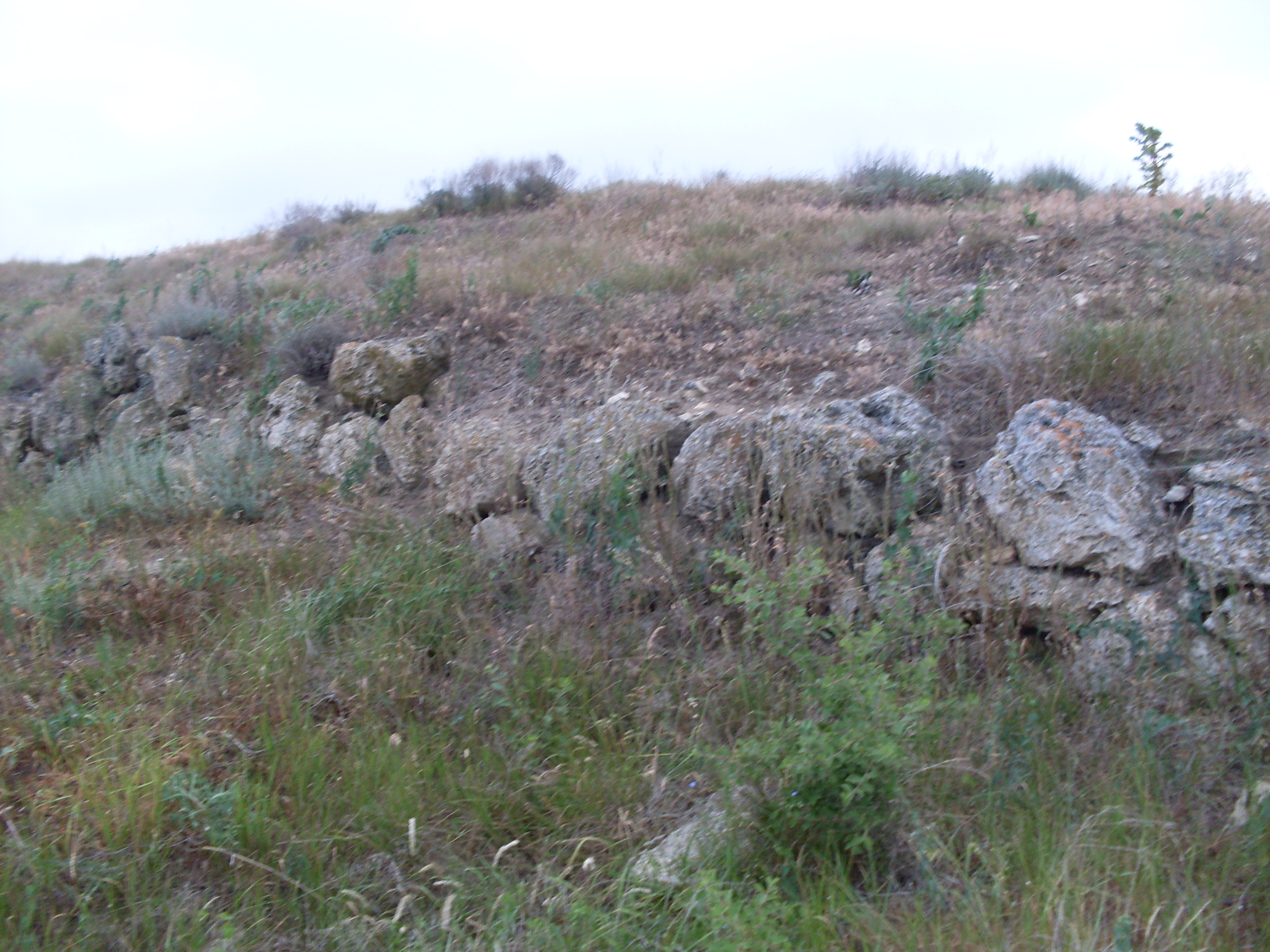
