= Russian Regional Development Bank =

Bank of Russia

- Russian Regional Development Bank logo
- Company type: Open joint-stock company (PJSC)
- Industry: Financial services
- Founded: March 27, 1996; 29 years ago
- Founder: Russian government
- Headquarters: Moscow, Russia
- Products: Development loans
- Owner: Russian government
- Website: www.vbrr.ru

The Russian Regional Development Bank is a Russian development bank founded on 27 March 1996 in a form of PJSC. The RRDB offers a general variety of banking services.

== History ==
The RRDB was founded by Rosneft on 27 March 1996.

In early 2020, the RRDB came to attention for its facilitation of the Vedomosti ownership transaction, and correlative appointment of editor-in-chief Andrei Shmarov, a person known for his affinities to Vladimir Putin and to RRDB parent Rosneft.

=== Sanctions ===
The bank was sanctioned by Canada on 22 August 2023 for association with the Putin regime.

In November 2023 the bank was sanctioned by the U.S. Department of the Treasury’s Office of Foreign Assets Control (OFAC) under E.O. 14024 for operating or having operated in the financial services sector of the Russian Federation economy.
