= Dmitry Sergeev (businessman) =

- Дмитрий Александрович Сергеев
- Born: June 26, 1975 (age 51); Tashkent, Soviet Union
- Education: Moscow State Institute of International Relations
- Occupations: Entrepreneur and business executive
- Years active: 2000s—current
- Organization: Love Syndrome
- Known for: Former CEO of AliExpress Russia
- Children: 3

Dmitry Aleksandrovich Sergeev (born 26 June 1975) is a Russian entrepreneur and business executive who is the chairman of the board of trustees of Love Syndrome Foundation (since 2016). He was the former CEO of AliExpress Russia (from 2019 to 2022) and board member of Mail.ru Group (from 2018 to 2022).

== Early life ==
Dmitry Sergeev was born on 26 June 1975 in Tashkent, moved to Moscow, and graduated from the Moscow State Institute of International Relations International Law department.

== Career ==
Sergeev's career began in the legal department of Alfa-Bank in the early 2000s but soon shifted toward media management. In 2022, he was appointed managing director of Regional Media Group, which consolidated Ivan Tavrin's assets in mass media. Since then, he has held executive roles in several media companies: corporate director of TV-3 channel, deputy CEO of Regional Media Group, and CEO of Media1 holding. Since 2009, he has worked at United Television Holding (UTV) and became its CEO. From 2012 to 2013, Sergeev was a director general of Kommersant publishing house.

In January 2014, Sergeev was appointed executive director of VK, responsible for the financial management of the social network. Later in 2014, he became the first deputy director of Mail.ru Group. Since 2016, he has been the first deputy CEO of Mail.ru Group and subsequently became a board member in 2018. He left the board in January 2022. From 2019 to 2022, he was a co-CEO of AliExpress Russia, the joint venture of Alibaba Group, Mail.ru Group, MegaFon, and the Russian Direct Investment Fund. In 2022, Sergeev left the company.

== Philanthropy ==
Since 2016, Sergeev has been the chairman of the board of trustees of the Love Syndrome Foundation, which aims to create a comfortable environment for people with Down syndrome to study, develop, and work. He has partnered with the international Downside Up Foundation and helped launch sports, employment, and volunteering projects. He also works on public campaigns that create a positive image of people with mental disabilities in society. He produced an "Eating an Elephant" documentary about theater actors with Down syndrome and a "Small Andrew's Diary" animated movie about a boy with a mental disability.

== Personal life ==
Dmitry Sergeev is married with three children.
