= Deltathree =

VoIP company

Deltathree inc.
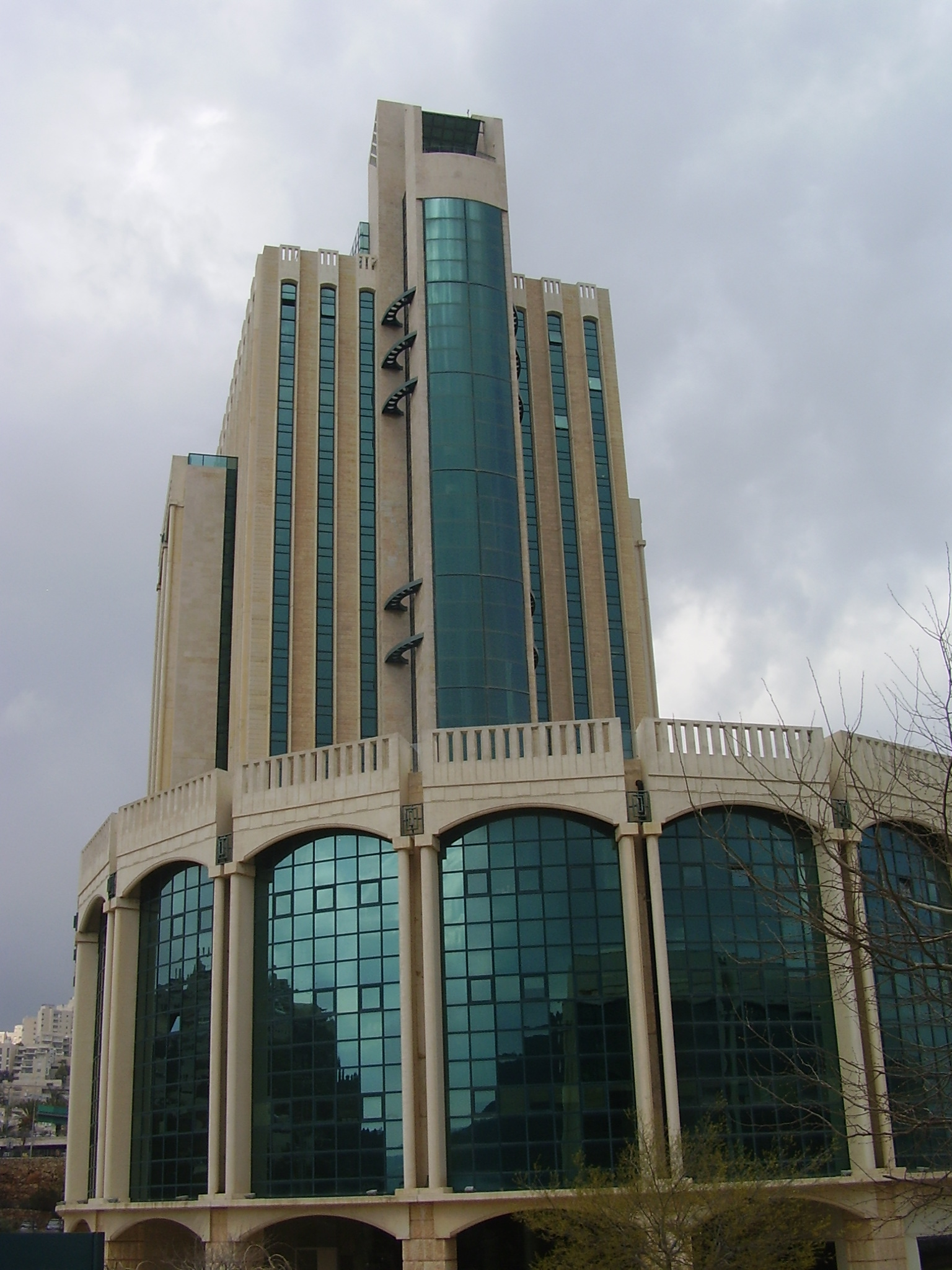
- Deltathree's research and development facility, and operational center at the Jerusalem Technology Park
- Type: Public (OTCQB: DDDC)
- Industry: Communications services
- Founded: 1996; 30 years ago
- Defunct: 12 February 2009
- Headquarters: New York City, United States
- Key people: Dror Gonen (President and CEO), Lior Samuelson (Chairman of the board)
- Products: Voice over IP
- Revenue: US$29.47 million (2007)
- Net income: ▼ (US$9.31 million) (2007)
- Number of employees: 155
- Website: deltathree.com

Deltathree Inc. was an American company engaged in the business of voice over IP telephony services. The company was one of the first in the world to offer a telephony service over the internet.

Users can either use the free softdialer product and make calls through their computer, or sign up for the broadband phone service and receive an Analog Telephony Adapter (ATA) or the linksys PAP2 device. Both devices allows users to plug a standard phone into their internet connection and make calls independent of the PC.

== History ==
Deltathree was founded in 1996 by Dmitry Goroshevsky, Sophia Babkove, Damian Kudriavtsev, Elie Wurtman and Jacob Ner David to develop an Internet-based international low cost calling service using VoIP technology, and a "PC to Phone" solution, using a technology developed by Israeli company VocalTec Communications. RSL Communications, an investment firm owned by Ronald Lauder, acquired a majority stake in Deltathree the following year, before the company listed on the NASDAQ stock exchange in November 1999. Elie Wurtman served as CEO from the company's founding until the November 1999 IPO. During that time, Wurtman completed the first historic transcontinental phone-to-phone VoIP call with FCC Chairman Reed Hundt. In 2001, RSL Communications sold its stake in the company to billionaire entrepreneur Yitzhak Tshuva who later sold his shares at a profit.

In 2001, the original company founders left to start a new company named CrossOptix, that developed ultra-high speed optical interconnect solutions; Noam Bardin was appointed as CEO; Bardin left in 2007 and later become CEO of popular GPS application Waze.

The company's shares were delisted by NASDAQ in March 2008 after falling below $1, forcing Deltathree stock to trade through the OTC Bulletin Board.

In February 2009, Deltathree announced that it had sold a majority stake (54.3%) to D4 Holdings for $1.17 million in cash. Under the agreement D4 also received the right to pick up an additional 30 million shares at 4 cents a share for the next ten years.

== Operations ==
Deltathree's research and development facility, and operational center is based at the Jerusalem Technology Park.
