= Scythian revolt against Mithridates VI =

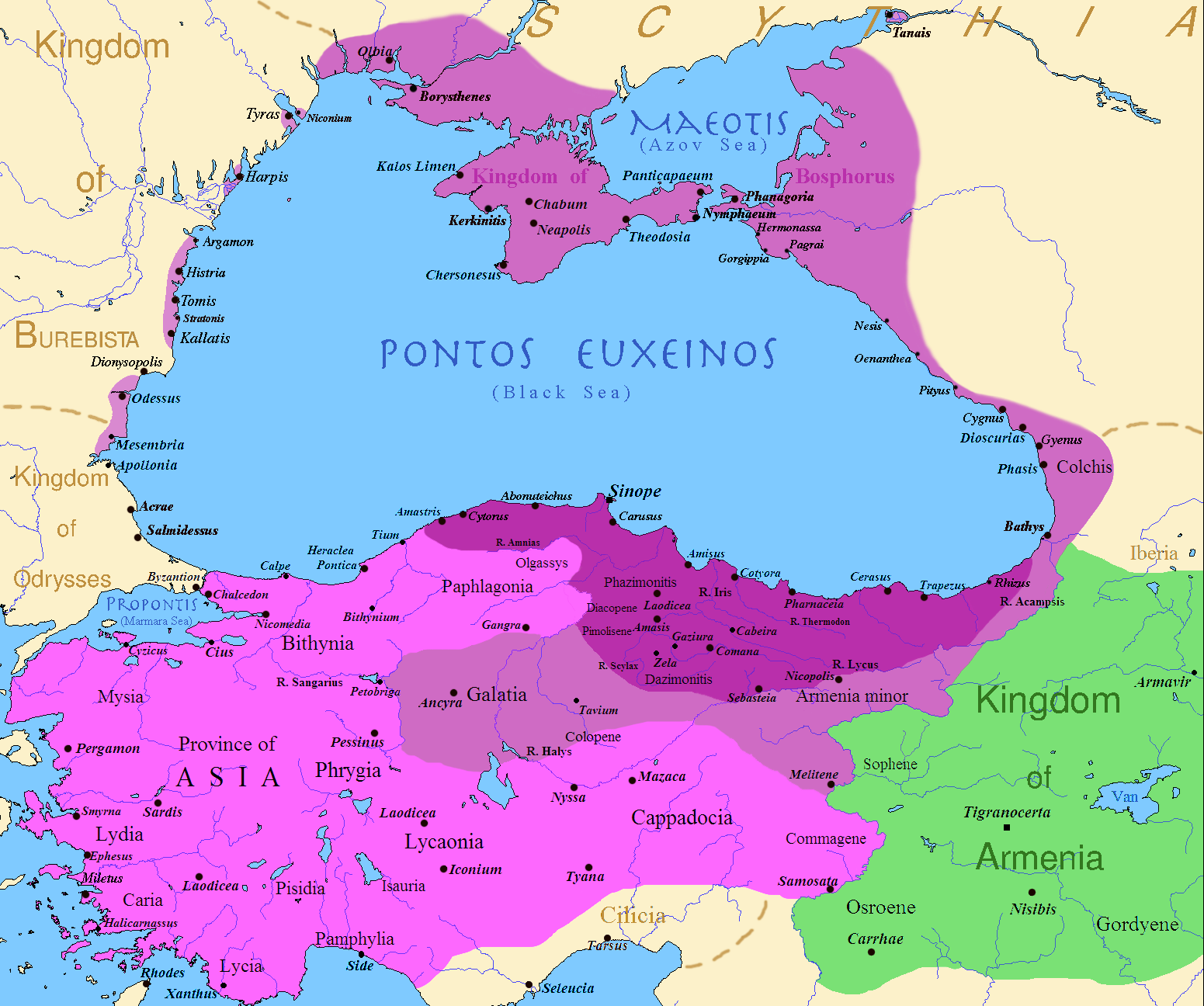
- Kingdom of Pontus under the reign of Mithradates VI
Date	107–106 BCE
Location	Crimea
Result	Revolt suppressed
Territorial changes	Bosporan Kingdom becomes a part of the Kingdom of Pontus

Belligerents
Scythians; Supported by: Roxolani	Kingdom of Pontus; Bosporan Kingdom

Commanders and leaders
Saumacus	Kingdom of Pontus: Mithradates VI; Diophantus; Bosporan Kingdom: Paerisades V †

Strength
Unknown	Unknown

Casualties and losses
Possibly heavy	Unknown

The Scythian revolt against Mithridates VI was a major uprising started in 107 BCE in Crimea, led by the Scythian Saumacus against the occupying forces of the Bosporan Kingdom and allied Kingdom of Pontus forces led by the general Diophantus. In the end the revolt was suppressed, the Spartocid dynasty came to an end, and the Bosporan Kingdom fell under Pontic control.

== Background ==
After the first Crimean campaign of Diophantus, Scythian Crimea fell under Bosporan control. Tensions between the native population and the Bosporan Kingdom were steadily increasing, with Paerisades IV potentially having been killed during one of these conflicts. His successor, his younger brother Paerisades V, found himself unable to make headway against the increasingly violent Scythian attacks and called for the aid of Mithradates VI of Pontus, willing to surrender Bosporan independence in exchange for survival. Mithradates then dispatched his general Diophantus to enter into talks with Paerisades, hoping to bring the Bosporan Kingdom under his control.

== Revolt ==
In the city of Panticapaeum, Paerisades and Diophantus met to finalize their prior agreement to trade Bosporan sovereignty for Pontic protection. In an attempt to derail this plan, the talks were interrupted by a major Scythian uprising under the leadership of one Saumacus. Saumacus was likely a Scythian noble or hostage who was adopted by Paerisades himself in a likely attempt to appease the native population and secure political ties. The Scythians were also aided by the Roxolani, a Sarmatian people.

During this revolt, Paerisades V was killed by the Scythians, bringing an end to the Spartocid dynasty. Diophantus fled by boat, barely managing to escape to nearby Chersonesus. There he began to assemble troops and ships, but ultimately had to wait until he could secure support from Mithridates before he could strike.

By springtime, Diophantus had his Pontic reinforcements and was ready to return. Returning to the Bosporus with a sizeable fleet, he first captured the city of Theodosia before moving on and taking Panticapaeum. After his brief reign, Saumacus was captured and sent to Pontus and his supporters responsible for the revolt faced punishment.

With this decisive victory, the revolt came to an end after only a year. Some Scythians fled Crimea to the remnants of the Scythian Kingdom in the north, while others came to terms with the shift in power. The Kingdom of Pontus followed through on their earlier deal with Paerisades, transferring control of the Bosporan Kingdom to Mithridates VI. With this victory, Pontic control over Crimea was secured.

== Aftermath ==
After the revolt the power and significance of Scythians finally faded away in the Pontic Steppe, allowing for the assimilation of Scythians by Sarmatians.

== See also ==
- Diophantus (general)
- Paerisades V
- Scythia Minor (Crimea) and Scythian Neapolis
