= Diplomacy in the ancient northern Black Sea =

Interstate relationships in northern Black Sea

The Greek colonization of the Crimea and its surrounding lands began after the 7th century BCE. Due to the geographic distance from their homeland and the presence of hostile neighbours, the Greek city states must rely on one another and maintain amicable relationships with the indigenous peoples to survive.

Greek activity in the northern Black Sea is not well documented. While there were Athenian accounts elaborating the history of the territory, they were often scarce and unreliable. As a result, scholars mostly rely on archaeological findings to interpret the relationships between the Greeks and indigenous peoples.

== Initial contacts ==
=== Gelonians ===
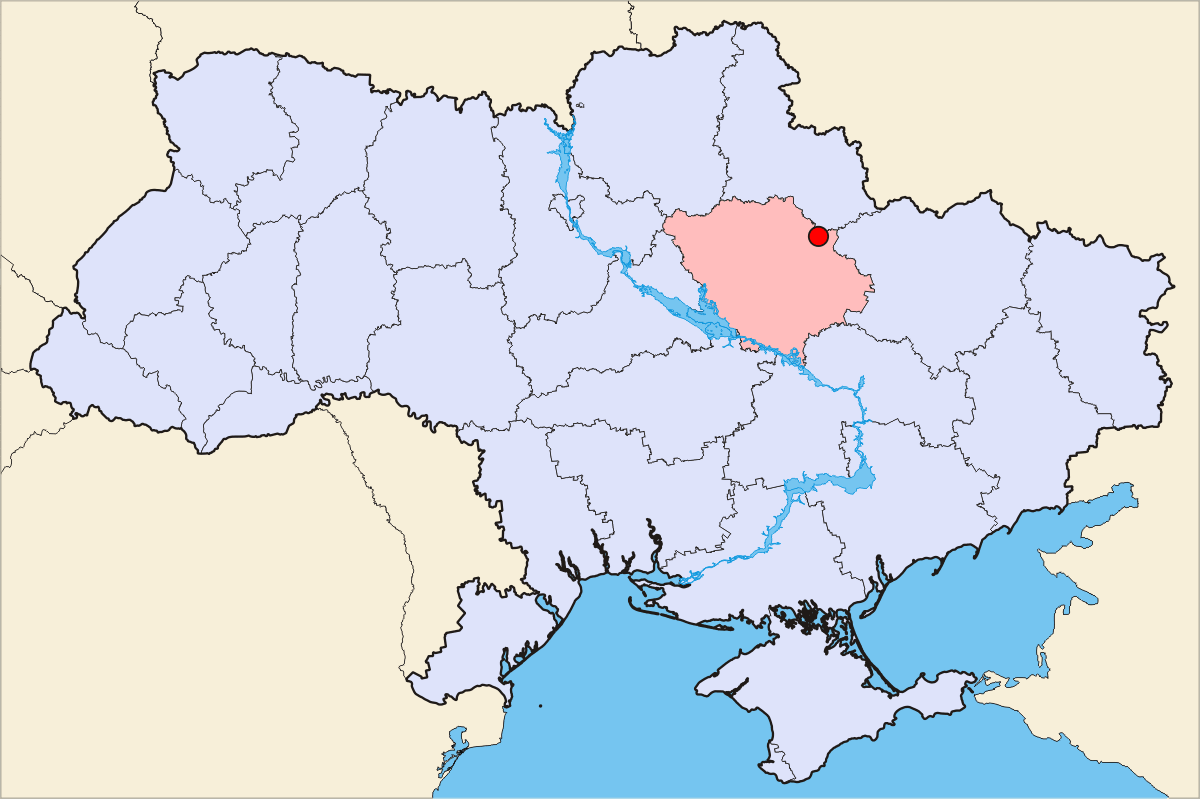
Location of Bilsk, the possible location of Gelonos

Before Greek colonisation, there were human activities in Crimea, such as the Kizil-Koba culture. Beyond that, however, there are no settlement records in the steppes at the start of the colonisation.

Meanwhile, in the forest-steppes of Ukraine, far away from the Black Sea coast, Herodotus (4.108-4.109) mentioned a city called Gelonos, inhabited by Gelonians. According to him, they were the descendants of both Greeks and the Scythians, and their language was a mix of Greek and Scythian. It is debatable whether the Gelonians actually existed, though archaeologists have already found the possible site in Bilsk hillfort.

=== Pottery pieces in the Forest-Steppe ===
Archaeologists have discovered massive quantities of Greek pottery pieces in multiple Scythian settlements, dating from the 7th to 6th Century BCE. Some scholars suggest that the pottery pieces were bought by the aristocrats in Berezan Island, a potential emporia. Current scholarship generally agree that the Greek pottery were gifts to the Scythians by the first settlers as a gesture of goodwill than a result of trade, indicating established relations between the Greeks and Scythians at the start of Greek colonisation.

=== Dugouts ===
Along the Crimean coasts and on Berezan Island, archaeologists have unearthed multiple dugout structures containing handmade pottery fragments of both local and Greek styles. The discovery raises questions on the nature of their relationship at the initial stages of Greek colonisation.

In Berezan, archaeologists found dugouts with a mixture of pottery fragments, with 10-20% of them displaying indigenous decorations by peoples including Scythians and Taurians. This suggests the presence of a sizeable population of various peoples in the settlement and Olbia, which controlled Berezan.

Scholars consider the significance of the fragments debatable. Sergey Solovyov proposed that their presence was a result of economic growths in the colonies. Meanwhile, Bujskikh proposed that the limited types of pottery found, mainly kitchenware and tableware, might imply that their presence was a result of trade. There might be mutual cultural influences between the Greeks and non-Greeks during this time

== Foreign threats ==
Greek settlements in the northern Black Sea.

=== Olbia ===
In the 5th century BCE, archaeological evidence in Olbia indicates that the Greek colonies became very defensive, as they constructed walls and the pre-existing choras were abandoned. Scholars attribute it to Persia's defeat in their invasion of Greece and a truce between the Scythians and the Thracians, leading to increased Scythian activity to the Greek settlements.

Grain trade between Aegean Greece and the Black Sea region in general started at around the same time. While initially it was insignificant compared to the imports of Greek pottery, it would later define the relationship with Aegean Greece as the latter became more reliant on grain from the Black Sea.

=== Bosporan Kingdom ===
To the east of the Crimean Peninsula, a loose military alliance formed in response to resist the Scythians gradually evolved into the Bosporan Kingdom. The only literary record of the alliance is from Diodorus Siculus' entry on the lineage of kings which introduced the 42-year dynasty known as the Archaeanactidae (12.31). However, scholars agree that the Archaeanactidae were not 'kings' as the kingdom relied on local aristocratic lineages to rule the cities.

The Thracians, led by the Spartocids, later took over the alliance and centralised it into a kingdom. Strabo (7.4.4) described them as tyrants, illustrating the centralization of power within the kingdom where individual city-states eventually lost their autonomy and identity. Notably, Leucon, the most notable king in the Kingdom, adopted the title of 'Archon of Bosporus and Theodosia and King of the Sindians, Toretai, Dandaroi, and Psessoi'. While scholars generally regard the Spartocids as kings, the distinction between the titles 'archon' and 'king' in this context remains a topic of debate.

=== Tauric Chersonesos ===
In the late 5th Century BCE, a conflict arose between the Bosporan Kingdom and Heraclea Pontica over the control of Theodosia, a major grain trading port in Crimea. After losing the battle, Heraclea Pontica colonised Chersonesos to preserve its interests from the grain trade between Crimea and Aegean Greece. Thus, the creation of the settlement shows the competitive dynamics between powers from the northern Black Sea and beyond.

Archaeological remains from the settlement reveal a mixture of Greek and Taurian pottery, the former of which predates its colonisation. Kerschner raised that the pottery might have been a gift to the Taurian elites, implying a peaceful relationship between the peoples before the founding of the Greek settlement.

However, some scholars argued that this interpretation is inconsistent with the surrounding findings in the settlement. The presence of defence walls in the settlement and the displacement of neighbouring Taurian population in the 5th to 4th Century BCE might draw a hostile relationship between the two peoples instead.

=== The Delian League ===
In Life of Pericles (20), Plutarch mentions a voyage Pericles conducted to the Black Sea before the Peloponnesian War. The motivation behind it is unclear. Historically, scholars suggested that the voyage was to secure the grain trade into Athens. Burstein disagreed, as Athens had multiple sources of grain and they did not need to rely on the Black Sea. Instead, he argued that the voyage was more about rallying support for the Athenian Empire.

As the war broke out, the grain trade between Athens and Black Sea states increased exponentially due to blockades from the Peloponnesian League. From then on, Black Sea trade became an indispensable part of Athenian commerce. This greatly benefitted the states in the northern Black Sea, as they were an important part of the trade.

=== Diplomacy between city states ===
Gradually, the city states formed empires of their own. Larger cities were annexing smaller settlements. For example, Tauric Chersonesos annexed the neighbouring Kerkinitis and Kalos Limen and reformed their choras.

Due to the need to protect themselves from foreign threats, larger states often engage with one another to ensure mutual protection. This is demonstrated in a treaty between Chersonesos and the Bosporan Kingdom made in the 2nd Century BCE. It stated that the Bosporan king Pharnaces I would be committed to protect the Chersonese from the 'neighbouring barbarians', in return of recognition and peace

== Foreign subjugation ==
=== Scythians and Sarmatians ===
From the 6th to 4th Century BCE, the Greeks regularly paid tributes and provided diplomatic gifts to the Scythians to ensure peace between their borders and expand grain trade with Aegean Greece. This can be seen from the discovery of gold and bronze objects in contemporary royal and elite Scythian tombs.

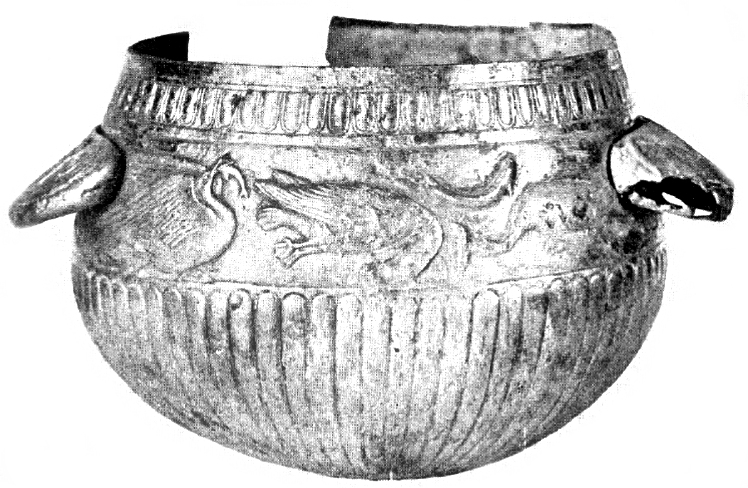
Greco-Scythian vase with rows of flying geese (5th-4th Centuries BCE). An example of mutual cultural influence between the Greeks and Scythians

Despite this, some cities fell under Scythian control. Coins uncovered during this period suggested that the cities lost autonomy at the time. Still, they were held in high regard in the kingdom due to their position as major ports for grain. Herodotus recorded the life of a Scythian king called Scyles (4. 79-80). Descended from a Scythian and a Greek, he had a Greek wife and chose Olbia to be his royal residence for 6 months every year. Thus, the conquest promoted the economic interdependence as the Greeks relied on Scythian protection while the Scythians profited from grain trade in the settlements.

In the 3rd Century BCE, the Sarmatians defeated the Scythians and dominated the steppes. The threat from the steppe to Greek settlements remained. A Chersonese decree mentioned how the Sarmatians attacked them during the Dionysus festival and nearly enslaved them. It shows how dangerous the threat is and that the states cannot protect themselves on their own.

Some Scythian remnants retreated to Crimea and established a kingdom centred in Neapolis. They became more actively involved in the affairs in the Black Sea. This could be seen in an inscription at a tomb in Neapolis, where the king was esteemed for maintaining a friendly relationship with the Greeks. They also collaborated with them, as seen from an inscription which mentioned the attack on Tauri pirates with a Greek state.
