= Scythia Minor (Crimea) =

Scythian kingdom in ancient Crimea

Scythia Minor Μικρά Σκυθία
- c. 3rd century BCE–c. 109 BCE
- Capital: Scythian Neapolis
- Common languages: Ancient Greek; Scythian
- Religion: Scythian religion Ancient Greek religion
- Government: Monarchy
- King
  - c. 2nd century BCE: Skilurus
  - c. 120 BCE: Palacus
- Historical era: Hellenistic period
  - Established: c. 3rd century BCE
  - Disestablished: c. 109 BCE
Preceded by
Scythian kingdom in the Pontic steppe
Tauri
Succeeded by
Kingdom of Pontus
Roman Empire
Sarmatians
Goths
Heruli
- Today part of: Ukraine

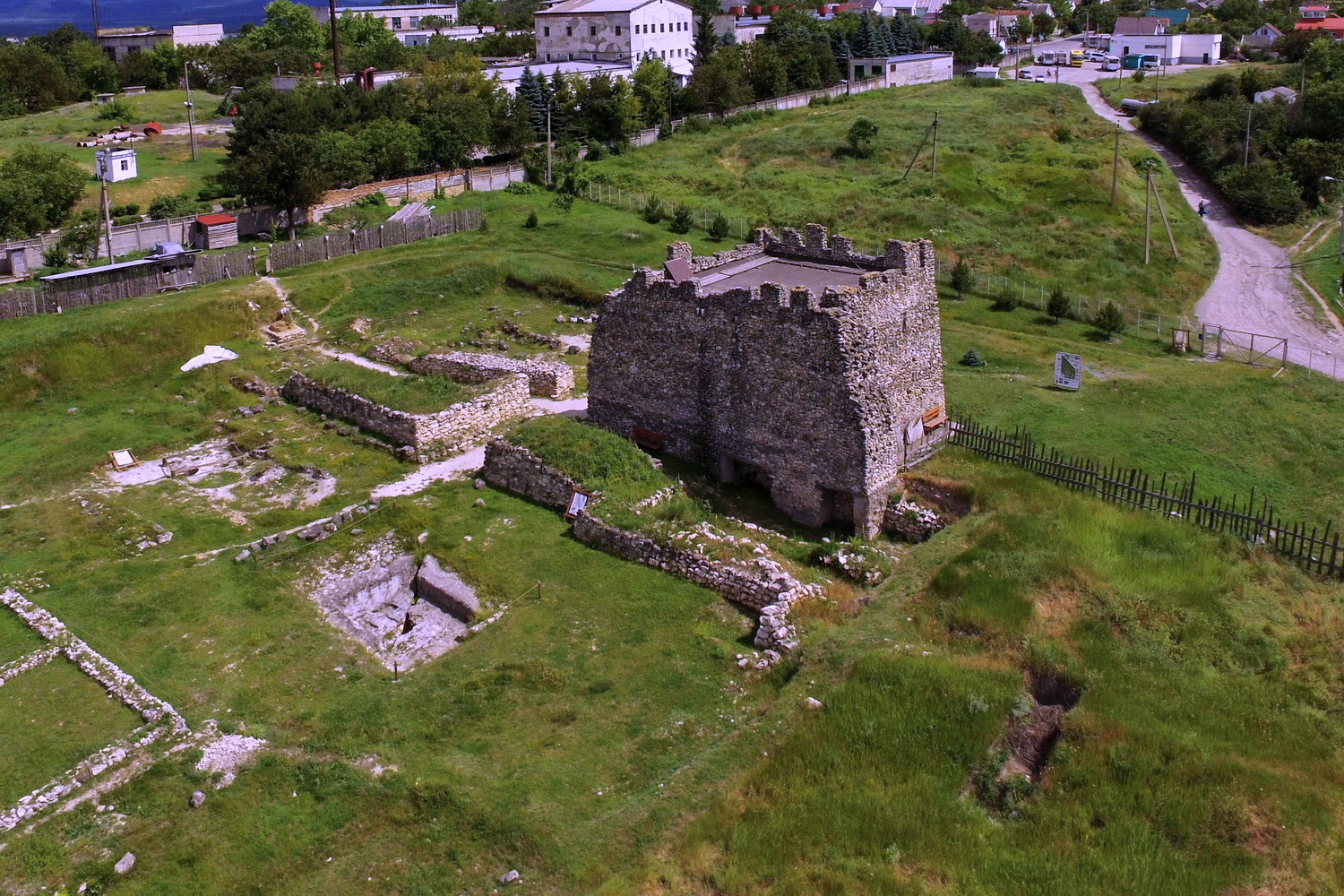
Remains of Scythian Neapolis near modern-day Simferopol, Crimea. It served as the capital of the Crimean Scythian kingdom.

The Scythian kingdom in Crimea (Ancient Greek: Μικρά Σκυθία, romanized: Mikra Skuthia; Latin: Scythia Minor, lit. 'Lesser Scythia') was a kingdom created by the Scythians during the 3rd century BCE in Crimea.

== Geography ==
The Scythian kingdom in Crimea covered a limited territory which included the steppes and foothills of Crimea until Taurida, the lower Dnieper, and the lower Southern Bug rivers.

== History ==
=== Background ===
The Scythians were an ancient Iranian nomadic people who originated in Central Asia in the 9th century BCE, from where they migrated into Western Asia in the 7th century BCE before settling in the Pontic steppe in the 6th century BCE. During the height of this Pontic Scythian kingdom, in the 4th century BCE, Crimea and the Dobrugea region started being called "Little Scythia" (Ancient Greek: Μικρά Σκυθία, romanized: Mikra Skuthia; Latin: Scythia Minor, lit. 'Lesser Scythia').

In the 3rd century BCE, the expansion in the northern Pontic region of the Sarmatians, who were another nomadic Iranian people related to the Scythians, as well as of the Thracian Getae, the Germanic Bastarnae and Sciri, and of the Celts, the Scythian kingdom disappeared from the Pontic Steppe and the Sarmatians replaced the Scythians as the dominant power of the Pontic steppe, due to which the appellation of "Scythia" for the region became replaced by that of "Sarmatia Europea" (European Sarmatia).

The Scythians fled to the Scythia Minor in Crimea, where they were able to securely establish themselves against the Sarmatian invasion despite tensions with the Greeks, and to the Scythia Minor in Dobrugea, as well as to nearby regions, where they became limited in enclaves. By then, these Scythians were no longer nomadic: they had become sedentary farmers and were Hellenised, and the only places where the Scythians could still be found by the 2nd century BCE were in the Scythia Minors of Crimea and Dobrugea, as well as in the lower reaches of the Dnipro river.

=== Kingdom ===
From the early 3rd century BCE, the Scythia Minor of Crimea started expanding against the Greek cities of western Crimea which had been so far been controlled by the city of Chersonesus, who had lost all its possessions not in its immediate vicinity by the middle of the century, with Kalos Limēn and Kerkinitis passing under Scythian control. Although the Crimean Scythians had been able to preserve some of their nomadic lifestyle, they were by then becoming more and more sedentary, especially in the lower Dnipro area, and were intermarrying with the Tauri of the Crimean mountains.

In the middle of the 2nd century BCE, the Crimean Scythians founded a new kingdom with Scythian Neapolis as its capital, and whose rulers titled themselves King of Scythia. The Late Scythian culture of this Crimean Scythian kingdom was not a continuation of the Scythian culture of the 4th century BCE, and the kingdom itself was significantly Hellenised and more closely resembled the Hellenistic kingdoms ruled by Barbarian dynasties than the previous nomadic kingdom of the 4th century BCE Scythians.

The Crimean Scythian kingdom had close relations with the Bosporan kingdom, and matrimonial ties linked their respective royal houses, with the Bosporan queen Kamasarye, who was the widow of Paerisades III, taking one Argotos from Scythian Neapolis as her second husband.

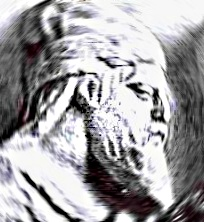
Scythian king Skilurus, relief from Scythian Neapolis, Crimea, 2nd century BCE

The Crimean Scythian king Skilurus from the 2nd century BCE ruled over central and western Crimea save for Chersonesus as well as over a significant section of the north-west of the Pontic region, including Pontic Olbia, where he issued his coins. Skilurus continued Scythian hostility against Chersonesus, but he kept good ties with the Bosporan kingdom, with a daughter of his marrying a member of its royal dynasty who was named Hērakleidēs.

=== End ===
The Crimean Scythians continued participating in the political conflicts on the Bosporan kingdom until Diophantus, the general of the Pontic king Mithridates VI Eupator, allied with their enemy, Chersonesus, defeated their king, Palacus, the son of Skilurus, some time around 110 to 108 BCE. Diophantus captured all their fortresses including their capital of Scythian Neapolis, thus ending the kingdom of the Crimean Scythians and annexing its territory to the Kingdom of Pontus. The Crimean Scythians nevertheless continued to exist even after the destruction of their kingdom.

Following Mithridates's defeat by the Roman Republic, the Crimean Scythians were able to regain some of their strength, and besieged Chersonesus, who asked help from Rome. The Roman legate of Moesia, Tiberius Plautius Silvanus Aelianus, campaigned against the Scythians, defeated them, and installed Roman garrisons in Crimea, including in Chersonesus. By this time, the Crimean Scythians were called "Tauro-Scythians" because of the significant mingling between the Crimean Scythians and the Tauri which had been under way since the 3rd century BCE.

=== Aftermath ===
By 50 to 150 CE, most of the Scythians had been assimilated by the Sarmatians. The remaining Scythians of Crimea, who had mixed with the Tauri and the Sarmatians, were conquered in the 3rd century AD by the Goths and other Germanic tribes who were then migrating from the north into the Pontic steppe, and who destroyed Scythian Neapolis.

== Society ==
The Crimean Scythians descended from both the earlier Scythian inhabitants of Crimea as well as from the peninsula's native Taurian people, who had intermarried with each other, and they had been significantly Hellenised due to the nearby presence of Greek colonies on the shores of Crimea.

These Crimean Scythians were a sedentary people who practised both farming and pastoralism, and they lived in small settlements near since then dried up small rivers. Crimea itself was also densely populated, although these inhabitants lived in temporary encampments rather than in permanent settlements.

== Kings of Crimean Scythians ==
- Skilurus (Scythian: Skilura), reigned c. 2nd century BC
- Palacus (Scythian: Pālaka), reigned c. 120 BC

== See also ==
- Scythian kingdom on the lower Danube

== Sources ==
- Batty, Roger (2007). Rome and the Nomads: The Pontic-Danubian Realm in Antiquity. Oxford: Oxford University Press. ISBN 978-0-198-14936-1.
- Ivantchik, Askold (April 25, 2018). "Scythians". Encyclopædia Iranica.
- Kullanda, S. V. [in Russian]; Raevskiy, D. S. [in Russian] (2004). "Эминак в ряду владык Скифии" [Eminakes, King of Scythia] (PDF). Вестник древней истории [Journal of Ancient History] (in Russian). 248 (1): 79–95.
- Melyukova, A. I. (1990). "The Scythians and Sarmatians". In Sinor, Denis (ed.). The Cambridge History of Early Inner Asia. Cambridge, United Kingdom: Cambridge University Press. pp. 97–117. ISBN 978-0-521-24304-9.
- Sulimirski, T. (1985). "The Scyths". In Gershevitch, I. (ed.). The Median and Achaemenian Periods. The Cambridge History of Iran. Vol. 2. Cambridge, United Kingdom: Cambridge University Press. pp. 149–199. ISBN 978-1-139-05493-5.
- Sulimirski, Tadeusz; Taylor, T. F. (1991). "The Scythians". In Boardman, John; Edwards, I. E. S.; Hammond, N. G. L.; Sollberger, E.; Walker, C. B. F. (eds.). The Assyrian and Babylonian Empires and other States of the Near East, from the Eighth to the Sixth Centuries B.C. The Cambridge Ancient History. Vol. 3. Cambridge, United Kingdom: Cambridge University Press. pp. 547–590. ISBN 978-1-139-05429-4.
- Tokhtasyev, Sergey [in Russian] (2005). "Проблема Скифского Языка в Современной Науке" [The Problem of the Scythian Language in Contemporary Studies]. Ethnic Contacts and Cultural Exchanges North and West of the Black Sea from the Greek Colonization to the Ottoman Conquest; [Proceedings of the International Symposium Ethnic contacts and Cultural Exchanges North and West of the Black Sea, Iaşi, June 12-17, 2005]. Iași, Romania: Trinitas.
