= Palakion =

Scythian fortress in Crimea

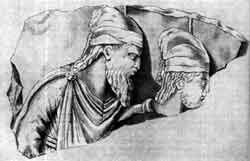
Skilur & Palak - Scythian Napolis: Bas-relief depicting the Scythian kings Skilur and his son Palak

Palakion (Παλάκιον), according to Strabo, was a Scythian fortress in the steppes of Crimea. The only information about it is from an inscription on the gravestone of a dweller of Chersonesos who died in a battle at the walls of Palakion.

Strabo suggests that Palakion, Chabon (Chabaioi) and Scythian Neapolis were named after sons of Scythian ruler Skilurus (Palakus, in the case of Palakion).

Peter Simon Pallas speculated that the name of Balaklava is a corruption of 'Palakion'. There is no historical evidence to this.
