= Camasarye Philotecnus =

2nd-century BC Bosporan queen regnant

Kamasarye II Philoteknos

Queen of the Bosporan Kingdom
- Reign: c. 180-150 BC or c. 180-160 BC
- Predecessor: Spartocus V
- Successor: Paerisades IV
- Co-ruler: Paerisades III
- Born: Unknown; Bosporan Kingdom
- Died: Panticapaeum
- Spouse: Paerisades III; Argotes
- Issue: Paerisades IV; Paerisades V
- Greek: Καμασαρύη
- House: Spartocid
- Father: Spartocus V

Camasarye II Philoctenus (Greek: Καμασαρύη Φιλότεκνος, romanized: Kamasarye Philoktenos) or Comosarye was Spartocid queen co-ruler of the Bosporan Kingdom with her husband Paerisades III from 180-160/150 BC. She was a daughter of Spartocus V and a granddaughter of Leucon II.

== Reign ==
Camasarye is presumably the namesake of one of her ancestors named Comosarye, another Bosporan queen of relative significance who also married her cousin named Paerisades. After the death of her grandfather Leucon II, she was presumably too young to rule as heir, so Hygiaenon, a prominent member of the aristocracy, ruled as Archon and probably as regent presumably until she or her father were of age. He ruled until 200 BC, at which point her father Spartocus became king and ruled until 180 BC.

Camasarye became queen in 180 BC and was very politically active throughout her reign as queen being mentioned in many inscriptions, such as with her and her husband Paerisades being honored at Delphi for the treatment of foreigners in their kingdom. At some point during her reign, she took the surname "Philotecnus" which means "children-adoring" possibly to show a strong bond with her children. She bore presumably two sons to Paerisades, Paerisades IV and Paerisades V, the last kings of the Bosporan Kingdom.

Prior to 160 BC, Camasarye married Argotes, who may have been a Scythian prince and a son of an individual called Isanthus.

== Succession ==
Camasarye was succeeded by her presumably eldest son Paerisades IV in 150 BC, who took the surname "Philometor" perhaps to show a strong relationship with his mother. He was then later succeeded by Paerisades V in 125 BC, the last Spartocid ruler of the Bosporan Kingdom.
