= Tyritakē =

Ancient Greek town in Crimea

- Τυριτάκη (Ancient Greek)
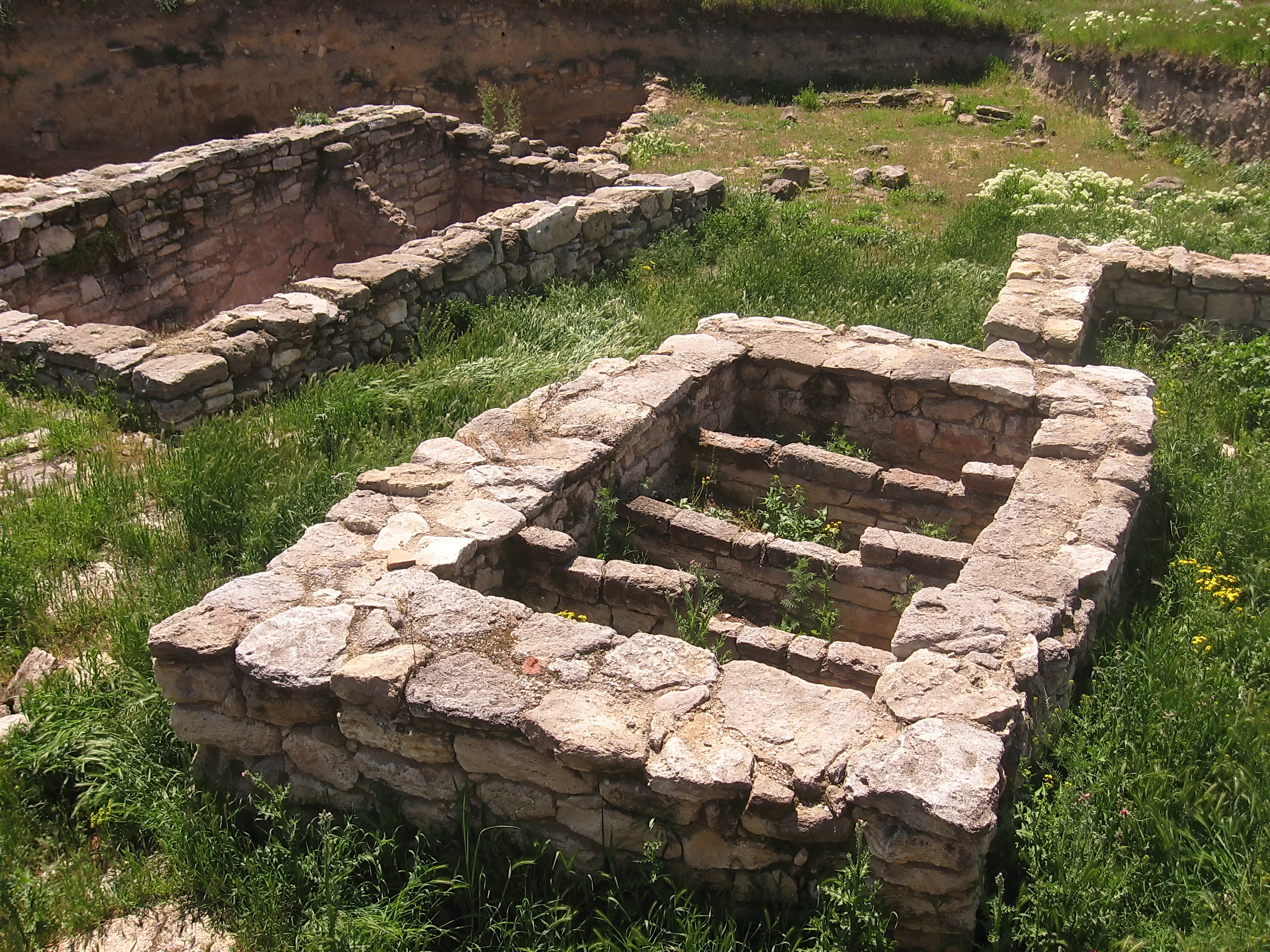

- Location within Crimea
- 45°16′37″N 36°24′25″E
- Type: Settlement
- Periods: Archaic Greek
- Cultures: Greek
- Location: Kerch, Autonomous Republic of Crimea/Republic of Crimea, Ukraine/Russia
- Region: Taurica

History
- Built: 7th or 6th century BC
- Built by: Settlers from Miletus
- Abandoned: Approximately 370 AD

Site notes
- Area: 50 ha (120 acres)
- Condition: Ruined
- Owner: Public
- Public access: Yes

Immovable Monument of National Significance of Ukraine
- Official name: Археологічний комплекс "Стародавнє місто Тірітака" (Archaeological complex of the Ancient city of Tyritake)
- Type: Archaeology
- Reference no.: 010014-Н

Tyritakē (Greek: Τυριτάκη) was an ancient Greek town of the Bosporan Kingdom, situated in the eastern part of Crimea, about 11 km to the south from Panticapaeum.

There are only few short mentions about Tyritake in ancient literary sources (Stephanus of Byzantium, Ethnika 642, 12; Pseudo - Aelius Herodianus, De prosodia catholica 315.12; Claudius Ptolemy, Geography 3.6.3.2; Ps. Arrian, Periplous Ponti Euxini 50,9 and Gaius Plinius Secundus, NH 4, 86-87 who names the city as Dia). The first serious excavations of the town started in 1932 (headed by J. Marti) and have been followed in 1946-1957 by great Bosporan Expedition headed by prof. V. Gaidukievich. In 70s and 80s the territory of Tyritake was excavated by an expedition from the Kerch Museum headed by D. Kirilin and O. Shevelev and since 2000 the project "Bosporan City Tyritake" directed by prof. V. Zin'ko. In 2008 the Polish Archaeological Mission Tyritake of National Museum in Warsaw, with Alfred Twardecki as director, joined the project.

All these archaeological projects were able to establish that the colony, founded about the mid-6th century BC, specialized in crafts and viticulture. In the first centuries AD, fishing and wine production became the economical mainstay of the town. Tyritake was sacked by the Goths in the 3rd century AD and again in the 4th century by the Huns, but a settlement on the site continued into the Middle Ages.

== See also ==
- List of Ancient Greek cities

== Bibliography ==
- (in English) - Tyritake, Antique Site at Cimmerian Bosporus, ed. A. Twardecki, Warsaw 2014
