= Greek Crimea =

Ancient Greek settlements on the Crimean Peninsula

Greek colonies along the north coast of the Black Sea in the 5th century B.C.

Greek Crimea concerns the ancient Greek settlements on the Crimean Peninsula. Greek city-states first established colonies along the Black Sea coast of Crimea in the 7th or 6th century BC. Several colonies were established in the vicinity of the Kerch Strait, then known as the Cimmerian Bosporus. The density of colonies around the Cimmerian Bosporus was unusual for Greek colonization and reflected the importance of the area. The majority of these colonies were established by Ionians from the city of Miletus in Asia Minor. By the mid-1st century BC the Bosporan Kingdom became a client state of the late Roman Republic, ushering in the era of Roman Crimea during the Roman Empire.

== Names ==
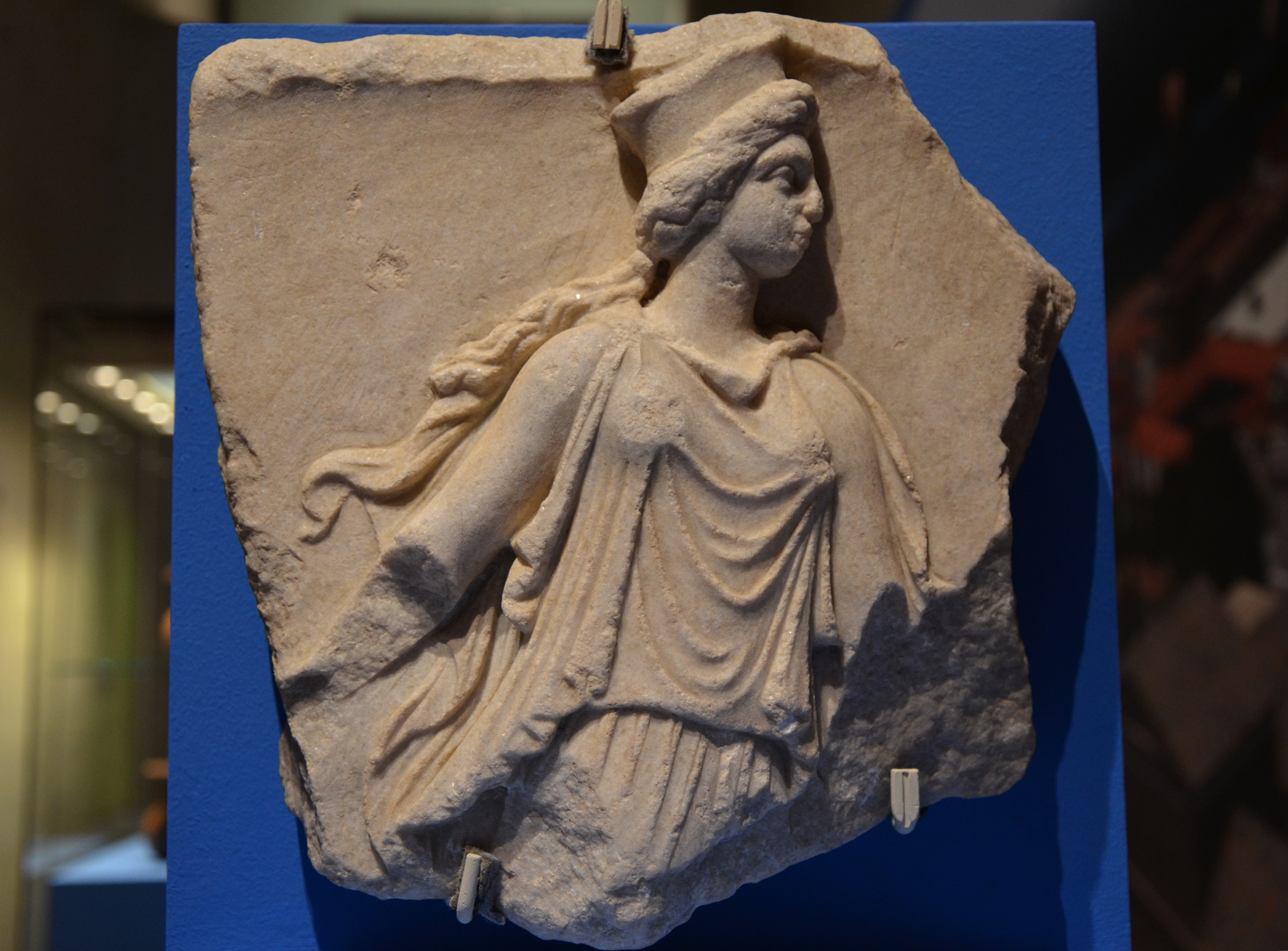
Fragment of a marble relief depicting a Kore, 3rd century BC, from Panticapaeum, Taurica (Crimea), Bosporan Kingdom

Taurica, Tauric Chersonese, and Tauris were names by which the Crimean Peninsula was known in classical antiquity and well into the early modern period. The Greeks named the region after its inhabitants, the Tauri: Ταυρικὴ Χερσόνησος (Taurikē Khersonesos) or Χερσόνησος Ταυρική (Khersonesos Taurikē), "Tauric peninsula" ("khersonesos" literally means "peninsula"). Chersonesus Taurica is the Latin version of the Greek name.

== Greek colonies ==
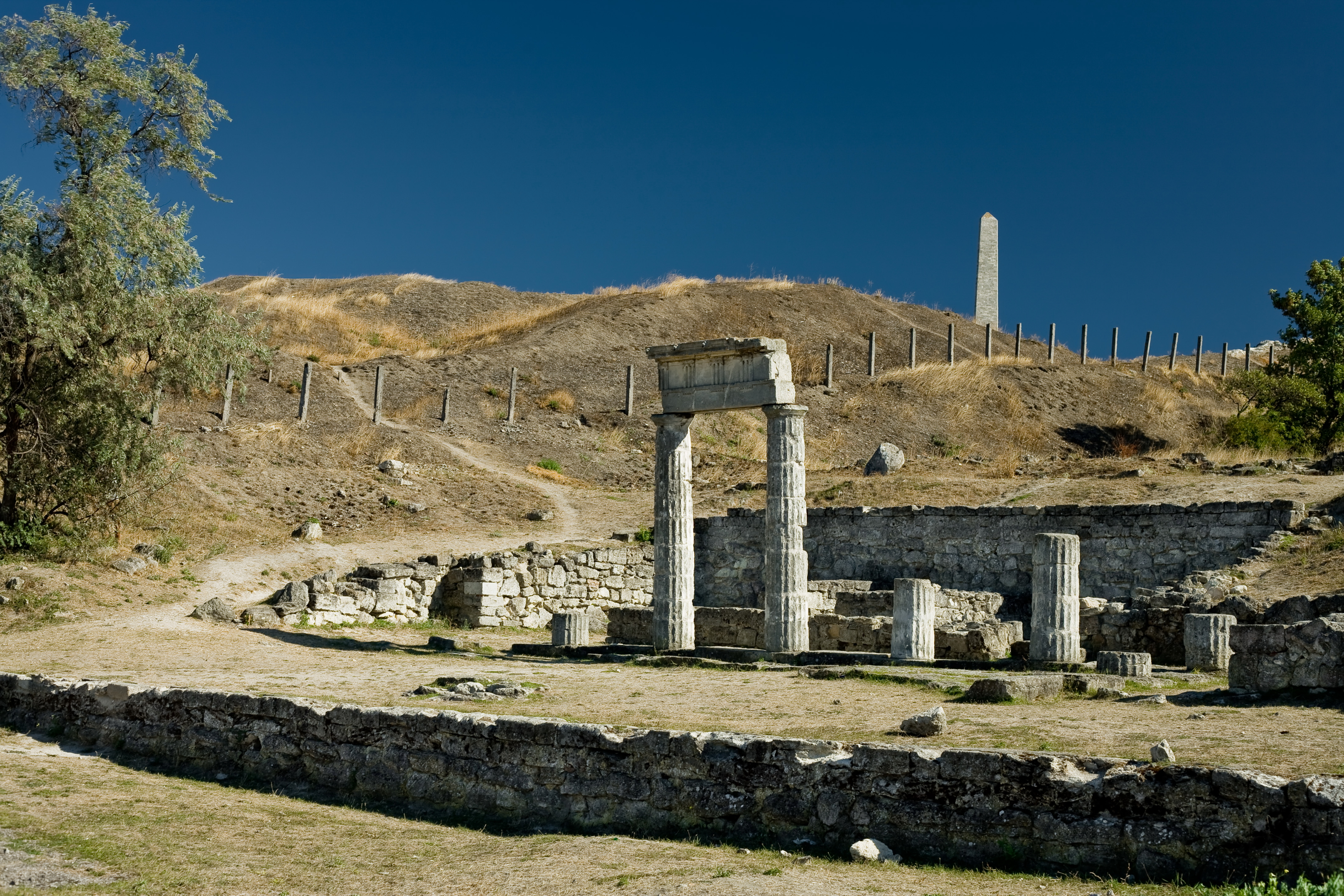
The prytaneion of Panticapaeum, second century BC.

The earliest Greek colony, Panticapaeum (Ancient Greek: Παντικάπαιον, romanized: Pantikápaion), founded in the late 7th or early 6th century BC, was established as an apoikia of Miletus (that is, a true colony and not a mere entrepot). This important city was situated on Mount Mithridat on the western side of the Cimmerian Bosporus, in the present-day city of Kerch. During the first centuries of the city's existence, imported Greek articles predominated: pottery, terracottas, and metal objects, probably from workshops in Rhodes, Corinth, Samos, and Athens (a style of Athenian vase found extensively at the site is named the Kerch style). Local production, imitated from the models, was carried on at the same time. Local potters imitated the Hellenistic bowls known as the Gnathia style as well as relief wares—Megarian bowls. The city minted silver coins from the 5th century BC and gold and bronze coins from the 4th century BC. At its greatest extent it occupied 100 hectares (250 acres).

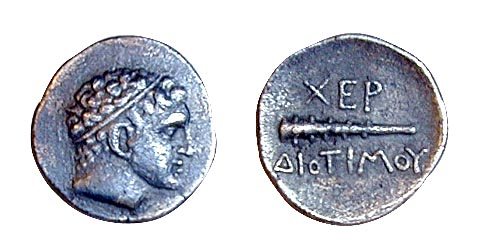
Greek Coin from Chersonesos in Crimea depicting beardless Heracles wearing the royal diadem . r., in exergue, ΧΕΡ ΔΙΟΤΙΜΟΥ Chersonesus in Crimea. 2nd century BC.

Other Milesian colonies on the Crimean side of the Cimmerian Bosporus included Theodosia, Kimmerikon, Tyritake, and Myrmekion. Theodosia (Ancient Greek: Θεοδοσία), present day Feodosia, was founded in the 6th century BC according to archaeological evidence. It is first recorded in history as resisting the attacks of Satyrus, ruler of the Bosporan Kingdom, about 390 BC. His successor Leucon transformed it into an important port for shipping wheat to Greece, especially to Athens. Kimmerikon (Ancient Greek: Κιμμερικόν) was founded in the 5th century BC on the southern shore of the Kerch Peninsula, at the western slope of Mount Opuk, roughly 50 kilometres (31 mi) southwest of Panticapaeum. Its name may refer to an earlier Cimmerian settlement on the site. Kimmerikon would become an important stronghold defending the Bosporan Kingdom from the Scythians. Tyritake (Ancient Greek: Τυριτάκη) was situated in the eastern part of Crimea, about 11 kilometres (6.8 mi) south of Panticapaeum. It is tentatively identified with the ruins in the Kerch district of Kamysh-Burun (Arshyntseve), on the shore of the Cimmerian Bosporus. There are only few short mentions about Tyritake in ancient literary sources. Archaeological projects have established that the colony, founded about the mid-6th century BC, specialized in crafts and viticulture. In the first centuries, fishing and wine production became the economic mainstay of the town. Myrmēkion (Ancient Greek: Μυρμήκιον) was situated on the shore of the Cimmerian Bosporus, 4 kilometres (2.5 mi) north of Panticapaeum. It was founded in the mid-6th century BC as an independent polis, which soon became one of the richest in the region. In the 5th century BC, the town specialized in winemaking and minted its own coinage. It was surrounded by towered walls, measuring some 2.5 metres (8.2 ft) thick.

Nymphaion (Ancient Greek: Νύμφαιον) was founded by colonists from Miletus’ rival Samos between 580 and 560 BC. It was situated of about 14 kilometres (8.7 mi) south of Panticapaeum. There is no archaeological evidence for the presence of Scythians in the area before the city's founding. The town issued its own coins and generally prospered in the period of classical antiquity from its control of the cereal trade. Athens chose Nymphaion as its principal military base in the region ca. 444 BC and Gylon, the grandfather of Demosthenes, suffered banishment from Athens on charges that he had betrayed Nymphaeum during the Peloponnesian War. It was annexed to the Bosporan Kingdom by the end of the century.

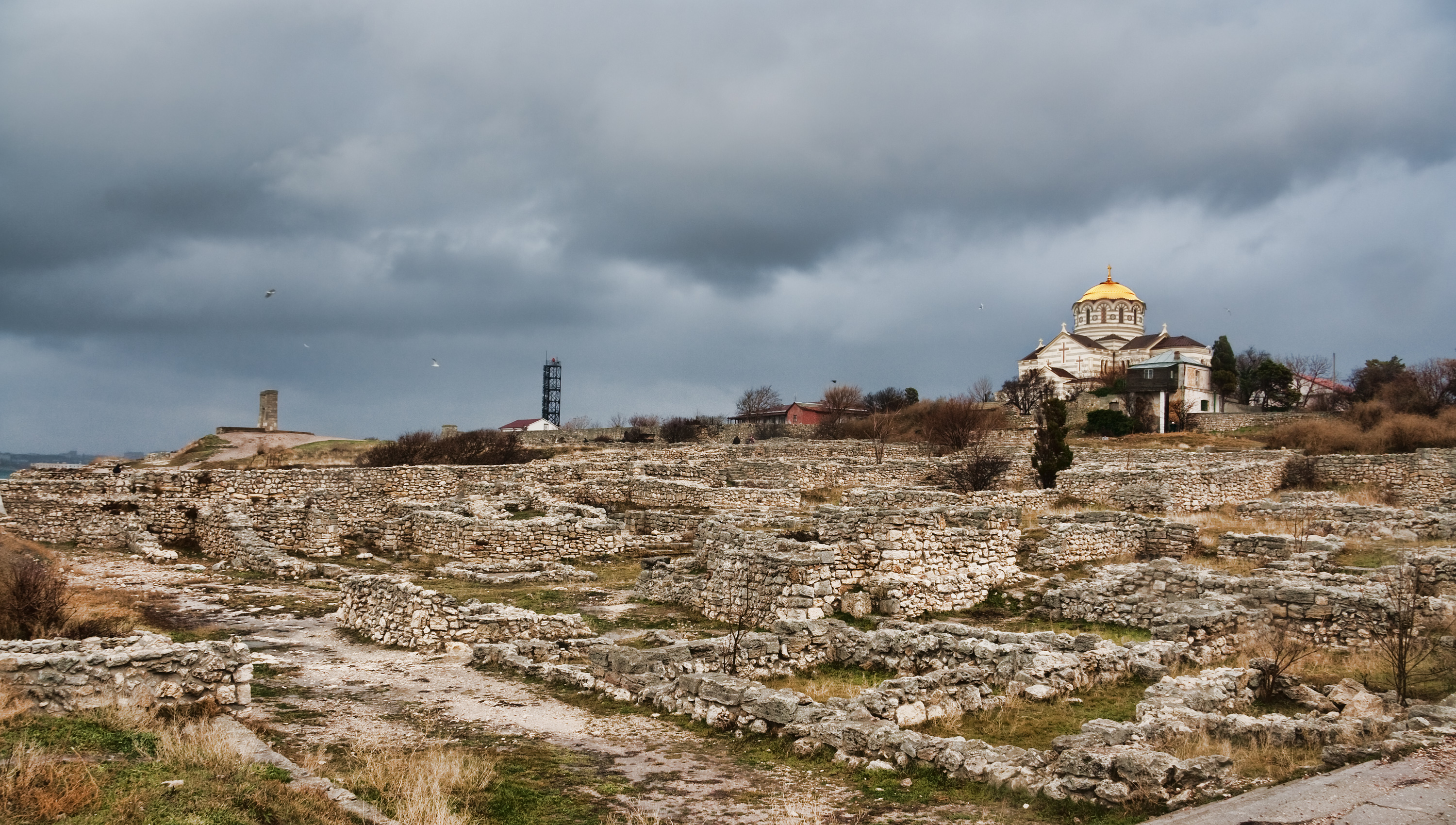
St. Vladimir's Cathedral overlooks the extensive excavations of Chersonesus.

In the 5th century BC, Dorians from Heraclea Pontica on the Black Sea coast of Asia Minor founded the sea port of Chersonesos in southwestern Crimea (outside modern Sevastopol). It was a site with good deep-water harbors located at the edge of the territory of the indigenous Taurians. During much of the Classical Period, Chersonesus was a democracy ruled by a group of elected archons and a council called the Demiurgi. As time passed the government grew more oligarchic, with power concentrated in the hands of the archons. Up to the middle of the 4th century BC, Chersonesos remained a small city. It then expanded to lands in northwest Crimea, incorporating the colony of Kerkinitida and constructing numerous fortifications. In 2013, Chersonesus was listed as a World Heritage Site.

Kerkinitida is the earliest colony in northwestern Taurica, located near present-day Yevpatoria. It was founded around the turn of the 6th-5th centuries BC, possibly by Dorians of Heraclea Pontica, or by another unknown Ionian city-state. Until the middle of 4th century BC the city was a small independent city–state, before being incorporated into the city-state of Chersonesos. In the 2nd century BC Kerkinitida was captured by the Scythians, but later retaken in the second campaign of Diophantus. According to archeological finds, the city lasted until around the turn of the 2nd and 3rd centuries AD.

In 2016, archaeologists discovered parts of an ancient Greek fortress near the village of Gornostaevka and in 2018 a previously unknown ancient Greek settlement of the 4th-3rd centuries BC near the town of Baherove. According to the researchers, the latter settlement was called Manitra. On the territory of the settlement the remains of a rectangular tower were discovered with an unplundered necropolis nearby.

== In mythology ==
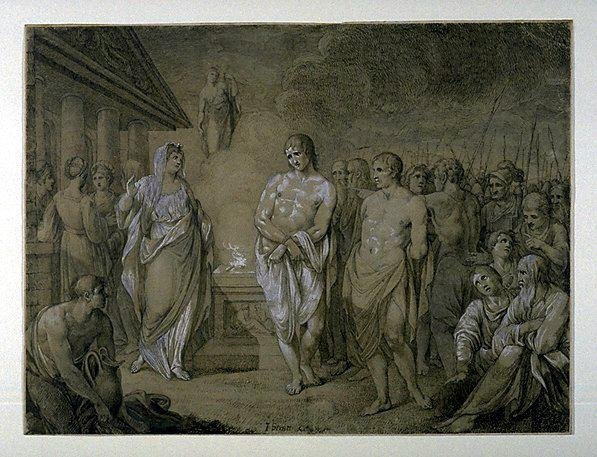
Orestes and Pylades brought before Iphigenia by Joseph Strutt.

According to Greek mythology, Crimea is the place to which Iphigeneia was sent after the goddess Artemis rescued her from the human sacrifice her father was about to perform. Artemis swept the young princess off to the peninsula, where she became a priestess at her temple. Here, she was forced by the Taurian king Thoas to perform human sacrifices on any foreigners who came ashore. According to other historians, the Tauri were known for their savage rituals and piracy and were also the earliest indigenous peoples of the peninsula. The land of Tauris and its rumored customs of killing Greeks are also described by Herodotus in his histories, Book IV, 99–100 and 103.

== See also ==
- Colonies in antiquity
- Greek diaspora
- Greeks in Russia and Ukraine
- Ukrainian Greeks
- History of Crimea
- Crimea in the Roman era

== Bibliography ==
- Shevchenko, Tetiana (2023). Greek Religion in Tauric Chersonesos. Oxford: Archaeopress. ISBN 9781803275628.
