= Paerisades V =

King of the Bosporan Kingdom from 125 to 109 BC

Last Spartocid King of the Bosporan Kingdom
- Reign: 125–109 BC
- Predecessor: Paerisades IV
- Successor: Mithridates VI
- Born: Unknown; Panticapaeum
- Died: circa. 109 BC; Panticapaeum
- Greek: Παιρισάδης
- House: Spartocid
- Father: Paerisades III
- Mother: Kamasarye Philoteknos
- Religion: Greek Polytheism

Paerisades V (Greek: Παιρισάδης; died c. 109 BC) was the son of Paerisades III and Kamasarye Philoteknos. He was last Spartocid ruler of the Bosporan Kingdom and ruled from 125 to c. 109 BC after the death of his brother Paerisades IV Philometor. With his death, ended a dynasty of Bosporan kings that had ruled the Bosporan Kingdom for over 3 centuries, starting in 438 BC with his ancestor Spartokos I.

== Reign and death ==
The kingdom had been under increasing pressure from the nearby Scythians, probably under the rulers Skilurus and Palacus. His elder brother may have been killed by the Scythians, as well as a probable relative named Spartokos VI, though his existence is disputed.

Paerisades V succeeded his elder brother Paerisades IV in 125 BC, who was already under pressure from invading Scythians who may have caused his death. To improve his relationship with the Scythians, Paerisades V may have adopted an individual named Saumacus. Towards the end of Paerisades's reign, Diophantus, a general in the service of Mithridates VI of Pontus, began attacking the Scythians under Palacus and then made his way to the Bosporan Kingdom's capital of Panticapaeum. There, he entered into talks with Paerisades to bring the Bosporan Kingdom under the control of Mithridates VI in exchange for his survival. The Bosporan Kingdom was suffering at the time from an economic crisis as well as increasing pressure from the Scythians. Diophantus returned a year later to Paerisades's court to finalise the deal, when Saumacus, Paerisades's adoptive Scythian son, started a rebellion which ended in Paerisades's death and Diophantus barely being able to escape in time.

== Aftermath ==
Diophantus returned with a bigger army and killed Saumacus. He then secured the throne for Mithridates VI, and was called "the first foreign invader to conquer the Scythians"
