= The Old Man and his Sons =

Aesop's fable

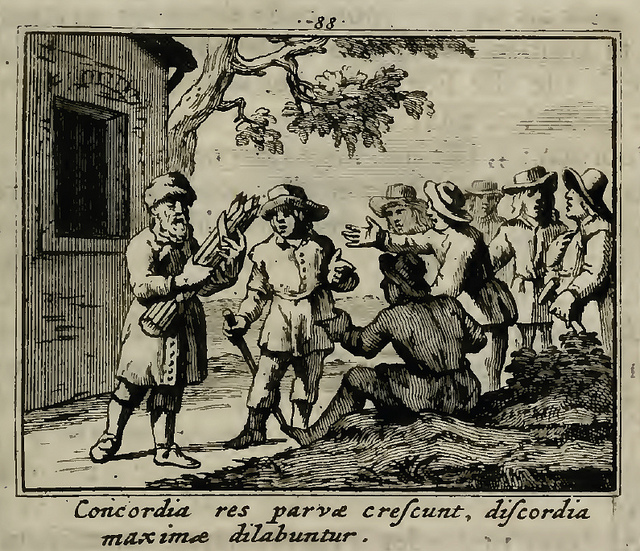
A 17th century illustration of the fable by Jacob Gole from Pieter de la Court's Sinryke Fabulen

The Old Man and his Sons, sometimes titled The Bundle of Sticks, is an Aesop's Fable whose moral is that there is strength in unity. The story has been told about many rulers. It is numbered 53 in the Perry Index.

== Fable ==
An old man has a number of sons who constantly quarrel with each other. As he nears death, he calls them to him and gives them an object lesson in the need for unity. Having bound a bundle of sticks together (or in other accounts either spears or arrows), he asks his sons to break them. When they fail, he undoes the bundle and either breaks each stick singly or gets his sons to do so. In the same way, he teaches them, though each can be overcome alone, they are invincible combined.

The fable was included by Babrius in his collection. Later, Pseudo-Plutarch told the story of King Scilurus of Scythia and his 80 sons. It has also been told about other barbarian kings or nomad khans by other authors, such as the Bulgar Khan Kubrat and Svatopluk. The story also travelled eastwards. It may appear in mediaeval Turkic manuscript fragments and on a Sogdian mural. Having entered Central Asian folklore, the story was also told of Alan Gua, an ancestor of Genghis Khan. Through textual transmission from the continent or by way of Jesuit missionaries, the story also found its way to Japan where the daimyo Mōri Motonari takes the role of the old man.

== Later history and interpretations ==
The moral drawn from the fable by Babrius was that "Brotherly love is the greatest good in life and often lifts the humble higher". In his emblem book Hecatomgraphie (1540), Gilles Corrozet reflected on it that if there can be friendship among strangers, it is even more of a necessity among family members. When the Neo-Latin poet Hieronymus Osius included the fable in his 1564 collection, he added consideration of the effects of disunion: "Just as concord supplies potency in human affairs, so a quarrelsome life deprives people of their strength." The French fabulist La Fontaine also stressed this aspect. In this version, the sons had not started quarreling when their father gave them his lesson, but descended into litigiousness over his estate following his death.

That the lesson of the fable could be applied to statecraft as well as personal affairs had earlier been realised by Pseudo-Plutarch and those others who told the story of ancient rulers. In more modern times, Pieter de la Court commented on its applicability to the Dutch Republic in his retelling of the story in Sinryke Fabulen (Amsterdam, 1685) as "A farmer and his seven quarrelsome sons". The story is prefaced with the proverb Eendragt maakt magt, een twist verkwist (Unity makes strength, strife wastes). The first part of this was eventually to be taken as national motto by a number of states in a variety of languages without necessarily referring to the fable. It was also associated with the fasces of the Roman republic, which consists of a bundle of rods, sometimes (but not always) enclosing an axe, symbolising the state's power to rule. However, the moral "Strength lies in union" was certainly given to the fable in, among others, Edward Garrett's new edition of Aesop's fables in the 19th century. It was also the perception of Alexander Sumarokov, whose variant of the fable explains the weakness of the Russian lands and domination by Tatars in the past as due to their division among numerous princes.

The political motto "Unity is strength" was definitely associated with the fable by the various trade union organisations that adopted it. A depiction of a man kneeling over a bundle of sticks on the ground was used, often accompanied by the motto on, for example, the badge of the Nottinghamshire Miners Association, on a Durham trade union banner, and on a trade token of the Worcestershire Co-operative Society. Some of these show a man crouched with one knee on a bundle of sticks, straining to break them, in a pose that appears related to John Tenniel's picture of the scene in the edition of Aesop's fables that he illustrated. The fable was also referred to by American trade union organisations in the 20th century, and it was among those chosen in 1970 by the activist Jacob Lawrence for illustration in gouaches which draw out the story's moral truth.

Earlier the fable was retold in a long poem that made no reference to Aesop but was represented as happening in England. This first appeared as a 1795 illustrated broadsheet published in London and Bath with the title "The old man, his children, and the bundle of sticks". There "A good old man, no matter where, Whether in York or Lancashire," gives the lesson on his deathbed and the poem concludes with a Christian reflection. Over the following decades of the 19th century, it also appeared as a cheaply printed chapbook and in book-length collections of moralising works.

Yakov Perelman had analyzed the story from a physical viewpoint in his book Mechanics for Entertainment. According to his calculations, in the case of seven sticks, the bundle is approximately 80 times as hard to break as each individual rod.
