= Paerisades IV Philometor =

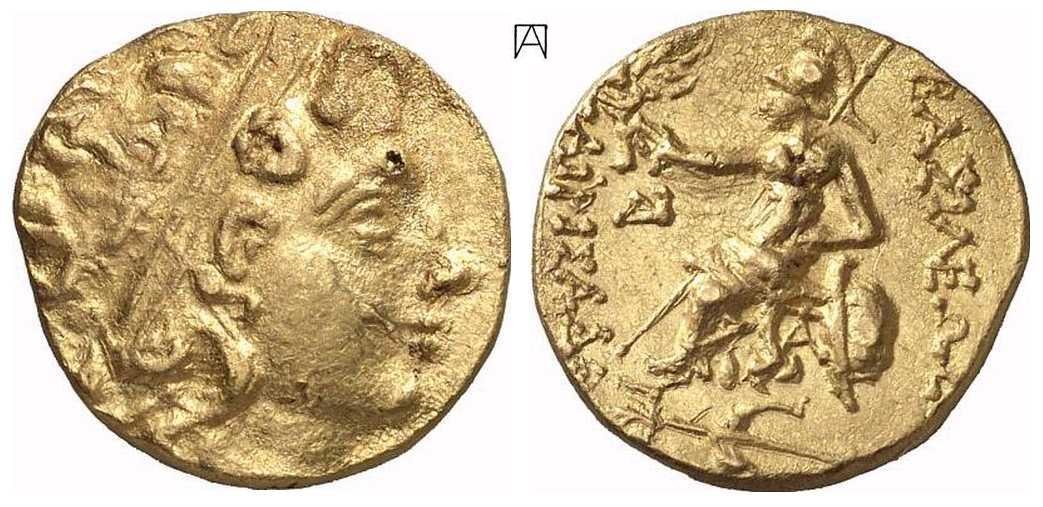
- Coin of Paerisades IV, with the king wearing a diadem on the obverse, and Athena seated holding a Nike on the reverse

King of the Bosporan Kingdom
- Reign: c. 150–125 BC
- Predecessor: Paerisades III and Kamasarye II
- Successor: Paerisades V
- Born: Unknown; Panticapaeum
- Died: c. 125 BC; Panticapaeum
- Greek: Παιρισάδης
- House: Spartocid
- Father: Paerisades III
- Mother: Kamasarye Philoteknos
- Religion: Greek Polytheism

Paerisades IV Philometor (Greek: Παιρισάδης Φιλομήτωρ; died c. 125 BC) seems to have been a Spartocid king of the Bosporan Kingdom from c.150 to 125 BC.

== Reign ==
He was presumably the eldest son of Paerisades III, and his first wife Kamasarye. He took the surname "Philometor" to show a relationship with his mother, whom he presumably cared for very much. Little to nothing is known about his reign or his death apart from his coinage and a genealogical tree created by Ferdinand Justi, only that he succeeded Paerisades III in 150 BC and that he was succeeded by his presumably younger brother Paerisades V in 125 BC.

== Succession ==
Paerisades V would rule until c. 108 BC, and he would be the last Spartocid ruler of the Bosporan Kingdom, handing the kingdom to Mithridates VI, the famous king of Pontus. His death marked the ending of a dynasty that lasted for three centuries in the Cimmerian Bosporus.

== See also ==
- Spartocids
