= Paerisades III =

King of the Bosporan Kingdom
- Reign: circa. 180–150 BC
- Predecessor: Spartokos V
- Successor: Paerisades IV
- Co-ruler: Komosarye II
- Born: Unknown; Bosporan Kingdom
- Died: circa. 150 BC; Panticapaeum
- Spouse: Komosarye II
- Issue: Paerisades IV; Paerisades V
- Greek: Παιρισάδης
- House: Spartocid
- Father: Leukon II
- Mother: Alkathoe
- Religion: Greek Polytheism

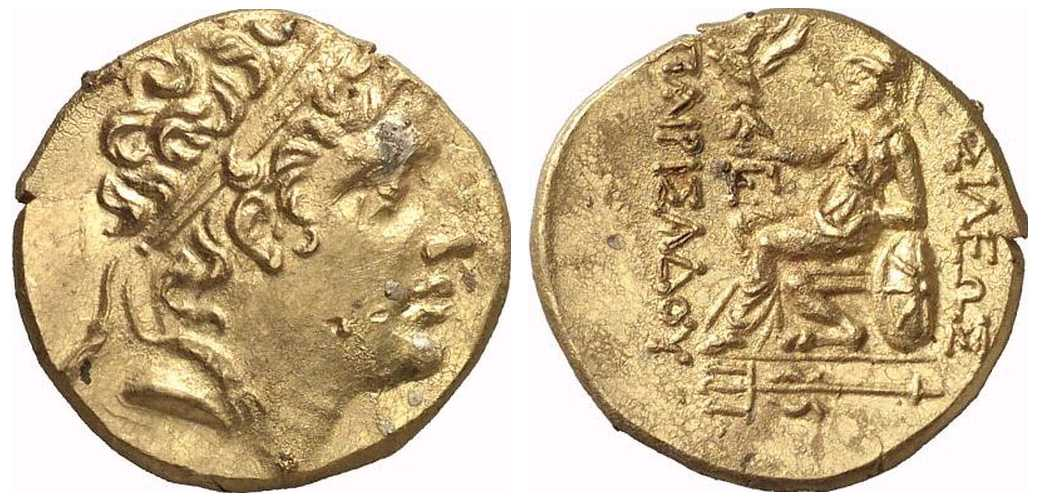

Paerisades III (Greek: Παιρισάδης; died c. 150 BC) was a son of Leukon II and Alkathoe, he also succeeded his brother Spartokos V as Spartocid king of the Bosporan Kingdom from 180 to 150 BC. He co-ruled with Kamasarye II.

== Biography ==
=== Early Reign ===
Before his rule, the Bosporan Kingdom was under the archonship of Hygiainon, a supporter of the Spartocids and perhaps a regent for Kamasarye who was unmarried and could not rule. He was not directly in the line of succession, as he was the son of Spartokos V's brother, perhaps Spartokos IV. Paerisades then presumably succeeded Hygiainon in 200 BC or perhaps Spartokos V sometime in 180 BC, the correct succession being unknown. He then married his cousin, Kamasarye. They were praised by an assembly in Delphi due to Spartokos V's and Paerisades's actions towards foreigners that entered their kingdom. Kamasarye would be the mother of his eldest son Paerisades IV, who later succeed his father

At some point during his reign, he may have taken another wife, possibly named Argotes, who was perhaps the mother of Paerisades V, the last Spartocid ruler of the Bosporan Kingdom.

=== Succession ===
Paerisades III was succeeded by his sons Paerisades IV "Philometor" (c. 150 BC–125 BC) and Paerisades V (c. 125-108 BC). Paerisades IV took the surname "Philometor," which means "mother-loving," to perhaps show a bond with his mother Kamasarye. His brother, Paerisades V, would be the last Spartocid king to rule the Bosporan Kingdom, ending a dynasty of three centuries.
