= Hygiaenon =

Hygiainon
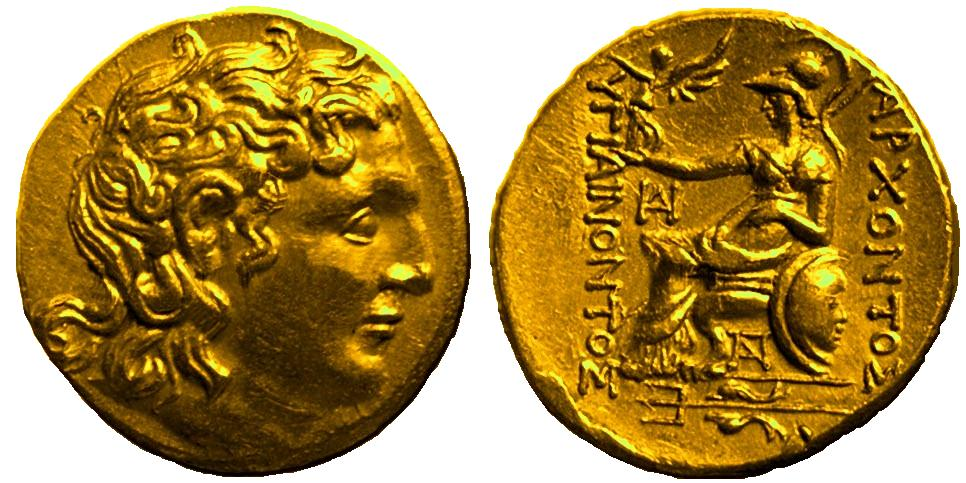
- Coin of Hygiainon

Archon of the Bosporan Kingdom
- Reign: circa. 220 BC
- Predecessor: Leucon II
- Successor: Spartokos V
- Born: Unknown; Bosporan Kingdom
- Died: Bosporan Kingdom
- Greek: Υγιαίνων
- House: Spartocid
- Religion: Greek Polytheism

Hygiaenon (Ancient Greek: Ὑγιαίνων, romanized: Hygiainon) was an Archon of the Bosporan Kingdom after his predecessor, Leucon II, was slain by his wife Alcathoe in c. 220 BC. Although he was not part of the Spartocid dynasty, he seems to have been a supporter of Camasarye, the heiress and queen of the Bosporan Kingdom. He is said to have been an eminent member of the aristocracy, and backed the unmarried Camasarye, who later married her cousin Paerisades III.

Hygiaenon was archon in the short time that Camasarye was without husband, as Paerisades III was the son of Spartocus IV's brother and did not have a direct claim to the throne. His coinage does not show him with a diadem, but may hint at military success.
