= Tasius =

Tasius is the name given by Strabo to the king of the Rhoxolani, a Sarmatian tribal group. Around 100 BCE, Tasius led an invasion of Crimea in support of the Scythian warlord Palacus. He was defeated by the Pontian general Diophantus.
