= Leucon II =

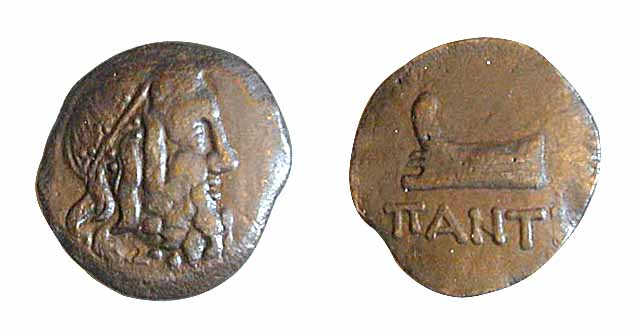

King of the Bosporan Kingdom
- Reign: c. 240–220 BC
- Predecessor: Spartocus IV
- Successor: Hygiaenon
- Born: Unknown; Bosporan Kingdom
- Died: c. 220 BC; Bosporan Kingdom
- Consort: Alcathoe
- Issue: Spartokos V Paerisades III
- Greek: Λευκών
- House: Spartocid
- Father: Paerisades II
- Religion: Greek Polytheism

Leucon II of Bosporus (Ancient Greek: Λέυκων, romanized: Leukon; c. 240 – 220 BC), also known as Leuco, seems to have been the second son of Paerisades II and a Spartocid ruler of the Bosporan Kingdom in 240 BC.

== Reign ==
Leucon killed his brother, Spartocus IV, after discovering that he had been engaged in an adulterous affair with Leukon's wife, Alcathoe, and assumed the throne. Supposedly, Alcathoe later killed Leucon in an act of revenge.

Leucon also supposedly endured an economic crisis in the 3rd century BC, when he minted new coins with his own name, in order to maintain his kingdom. He was the first Bosporan king to issue coins with his own name.

== Succession ==
He was succeeded by Hygiaenon after his death. Hygiaenon was not a member of the Spartocid dynasty and may have been a supporter of Camasarye, the daughter and heiress of Spartocus IV.

== Bibliography ==
- Stolyarik, Elena (1998). "The Reign and Chronology of the Archon Hygiaenon". American Journal of Numismatics. 10: 61–70. ISSN 1053-8356. JSTOR 43580389.
