= Diophantus (general) =

General of the Pontic Army (2nd century BC)

Diophantus (Greek: Διόφαντος Dióphantos), son of Asclepiodorus, of Sinope, was a general in the service of Mithridates VI of the Pontus. Diophantus was active in Mithridates' campaigns in the Bosporan Kingdom and elsewhere around the Black Sea, although their chronology is disputed. An inscription found during the excavations in Chersonesos glorifies Diophantus as "the first foreign invader to conquer the Scythians".

During his first Crimean expedition, he relieved the siege of Chersonesos by the Scythian king Palacus and subdued his allies, the Tauri. He finished this campaign at Scythian Neapolis. During the second campaign, Diophantus checked another invasion of the Scythians, who had joined their forces with the Rhoxolanoi under Tasius. At one point during these campaigns, he established a stronghold at Eupatorium on the eastern shore of the Crimea.

Around 107 BC, Mithridates dispatched Diophantes to Panticapaeum with the task of persuading the Bosporan king Paerisades V to cede his kingdom to Mithridates. While he was in the city, the Scythians, led by a certain Saumacus, revolted and killed Paerisades, while Diophantes barely managed to escape to Chersonesos. Back in Pontus, Diophantes rallied his forces and sailed to Crimea with a large fleet. The Scythian uprising was put down, and the Bosporan kingdom was reduced to a dependency of Pontus.
