= Scythian Neapolis =

Ancient Iranic settlement in the Crimean Peninsula

- Σκυθική Νεάπολις (Greek) (Greek)
- Kermenchik
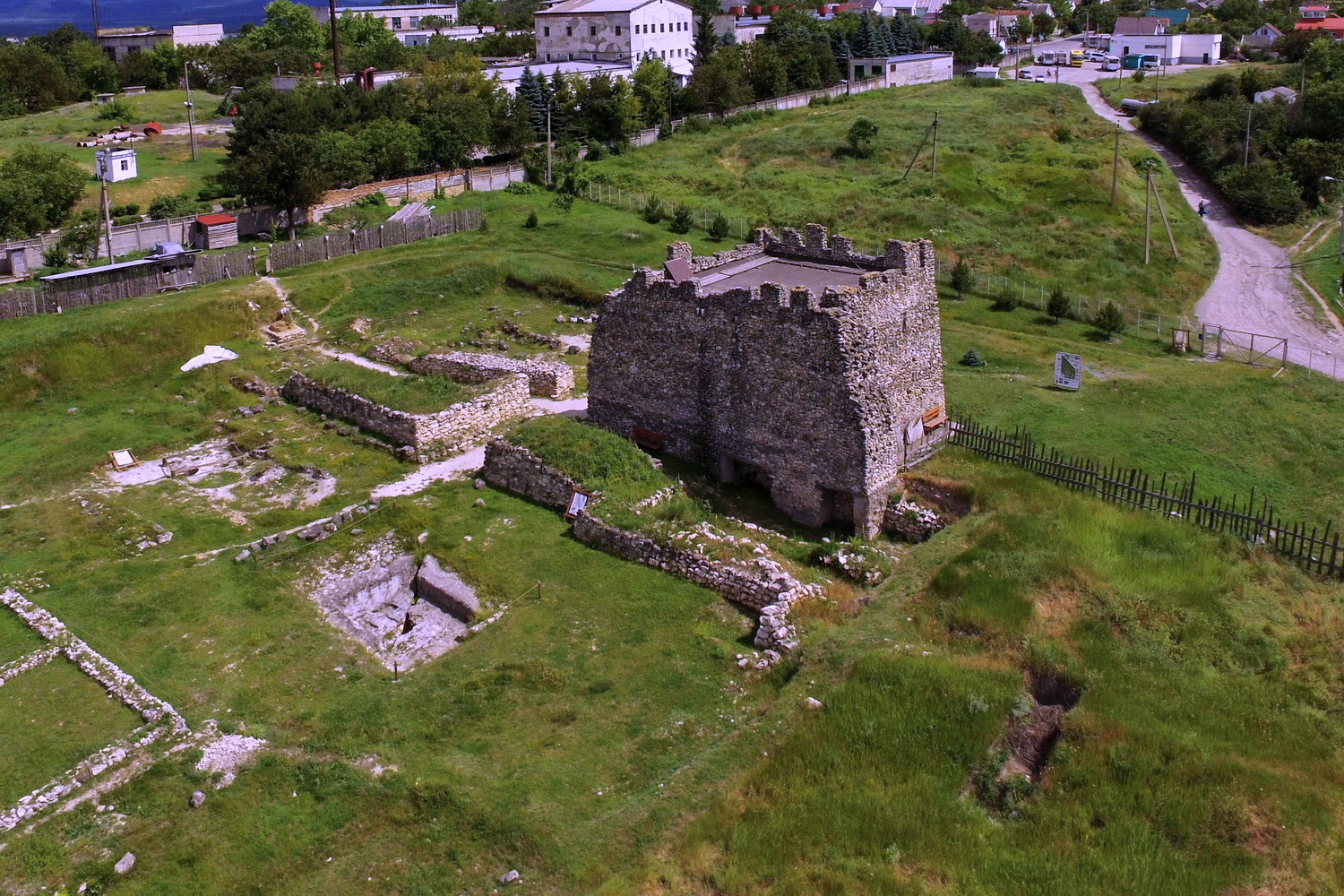
- 2016 photograph of the supposed tomb of Skilurus

- Location within the Crimean Peninsula Location around the Black Sea Location within Europe
- 44°56′34″N 34°07′14″E
- Type: Human settlement
- Cultures: Scythian, Greek
- Location: Simferopol, Crimea
- Region: Taurica

History
- Built: 3rd century BC
- Abandoned: 3rd century AD

Site notes
- Owner: Ukraine (de jure), Russia (de facto)
- Website: Historical and archaeological preserve of Scythian Neapolis

Immovable Monument of National Significance of Ukraine
- Official name: Археологічний комплекс "Неаполь Скіфський": городище і некрополі (Scythian Neapolis archaeological complex: settlement and necropoleis)
- Type: Archaeology
- Reference no.: 010001-Н

Scythian Neapolis (Greek: Σκυθική Νεάπολις), also known as Kermenchik, was an Iranic settlement that existed in the Crimean Peninsula from the end of the 3rd century BC until the second half of the 3rd century AD. It was previously considered a town of the Tauric Chersonesus, and was mentioned by Strabo as being the fortress and palace where Scythian kings resided. It is regarded as the capital of the Late Scythian Kingdom and the capital of Great Scythia. The archaeological ruins sit on the outskirts of the present-day Simferopol. This city was the centre of Crimea's Scythian tribes, led by Skilurus and Palacus. The town ruled over a small kingdom, covering the lands between the lower Dnieper and Crimea. Between the end of the 4th century BC and the beginning of the 3rd century BC, historians suggest that the Kizil-Koba culture occupied the area of Scythian Neapolis before any Scythian artefacts were found; Neapolis was destroyed by the Goths halfway through the 3rd century AD. This settlement was first excavated in 1945 by Schultz and Golovkina.

== Geography ==
Scythian Neapolis lies on a plateau on the ‘Petrovskiye rocks in Simferopol’. Its climate has been described as having long, dry and wind filled summer and winter periods as well as having moderate precipitation levels. The area of the capital was distinguished by forests and rich vegetation which includes wood such as oak, pine, poplar and alder around the fortress.

== History ==
The cultural landscape of Scythian Neapolis was diverse, with not only Scythian culture present but also the ‘sedentary Tauri’ and ‘the Hellenized population of the chorai of the Greek cities’. Ivantchik (2019) states that the Scythians of the time, including those inhabiting Scythian Neapolis, were closer to Hellenistic states in comparison to the ‘Scythians’ nomadic kingdom of the 4th century BC’. Evidence from craniology research in this area also indicates that no less than two groups of individuals of different origins were present in Scythian Neapolis.

During the Hellenistic period, between 128-124 BC, there were only minor signs of agriculture and cattle breeding which suggests that during this period the individuals that lived in Scythian Neapolis were only semi-settled. The absence of buildings and the ‘images of horsemen in the ornamental fields,…[and]…the mix of animal bones found among cooking waste’ in the Palace complex further suggest this. Archaeological evidence of ‘tiles, jugs, and cups, lamps and altars, and terracotta figurines’ illustrate that pottery manufacturing occurred, with it being primarily traded locally and used practically. Other historians commenting on it being 'somewhat unambitious'. This is demonstrated as handmade cooking ware, toiletries (tweezers, mirrors) and tools (knives, spinning wheels and needles) are archaeological objects found from this period. Imports identified during this period include amphorae from ‘Rhodes, Sinopa, Chersonesos, and Knidos’ as well as tableware, ornaments and ‘mould-made cups’, with the Southern Palace being the main area of relocation for them as of these objects were found there. The inhabitants of Scythian Neapolis lead a very simple life during this period, with open fires being utilised for food preparation and warmth. The Southern Palace was the exception, with luxury goods including a diverse range of Greek ceramics, Greek beds and imported bronze mirrors, were discovered. Zaytsev (2004) also believes that dice was a popular game, with more than 30 sheep astragali were found in one of the palace megarons.

Between the end of the 2nd century BCE to the middle of the 1st century CE more barbarian material culture was present amongst the individuals located at Scythian Neapolis. Through archaeological evidence there does not appear any development in the crafts, with pottery, bone and wood implements, yarn and cloth still being used internally and produced in small numbers. Imports, such as brown and red-slip tableware, special ornaments and beads, Roman items and Egyptian faience illustrate a bigger variety of goods being traded during this time, specifically stating during the 1st century CE. Whilst there was an increase in animal husbandry, evidenced through the finds of bones throughout the farmland areas in Scythian Neapolis, agriculture was not abundant as there is a lack of tools found during this period, except for some crude stone pestles used for grain processing.

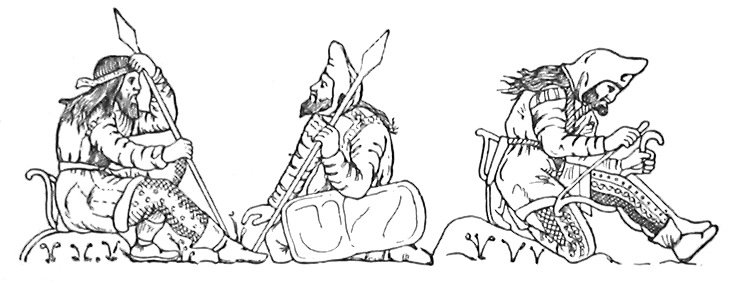
Scythian Warriors

The inhabitants of Scythian Neapolis shifted, during the second half of the 1st century and the third quarter of the 2nd century, moved from a mixed agricultural and nomadic landscape to primarily nomadic one, with changes in the fortress layout and plans demonstrating this. During this time, imported objects were a primary archaeological find with numerous red-slip pottery, glass vessels and metal items, including ‘enamelled Roman brooches’ (Vysotskaya as cited in Zaytsev, 2004). Daily life during this period included simple female toiletry items, such as mirrors and curling irons for hairstyling, and horse equipment that varied in skill. Kitchenware was identified as locally sourced, hand-made jugs, pots, open-vessels and cups with some imported red-slip plates, jugs and cups also being found. Battle armour included long and short Sarmatian-style swords and iron arrow heads. Graffiti was found during this time which has stimulated a debate on their meaning. There has been debate on their meaning with O.D. Dashevskaya (1962) suggesting that they were individual ‘autographs’ by the residents during ceremonies whereas other historians theorise that they have ritualistic meaning or were the works of Sarmatian conquerors (Vysotskaya and Puzdrovsky as cited in Zaystev, 2004). Zaytsev (2004) states that culturally, this period was heavily influenced by the Sarmatian culture as well as the neighbouring settlements of Bosphorus and Chersonesos.

During the end of the 2nd century to the middle of the 3rd century, which was the last period before the settlement was destroyed by the Goths, archaeological evidence from Scythian Neapolis suggests that its agricultural sector progressed with the settlement being considered an ‘agricultural hub’ due to the significant volumes of grain storage uncovered. Zaystev (2004) states that the population demonstrated the general characteristics of group settlements in the Black Sea region; ‘decline in lifestyle, total barbarization, and deep religious syncretism’. The archaeological presence of permanent granaries, hand-mills and primitive grain grain-pestles as well as carbonised apple and vines, which demonstrate the presence of viticulture and horticulture, further demonstrates the steady and settled agricultural sector present during this time. Excavators found the bones of horses, cows, goats and sheep which historians believe indicate that hunting games occurred and played a role in the economy of this settlement. Home-based production of pottery and items made of bone, wool, yarn and cloth was still evident during this period whilst imports of red-slip amphorae jugs from Bosphorus, and red-slip pottery from Chersonesos have also been found indicating trade with neighbouring settlements was still occurring. In these amphorae some contained wines which had been imported from Rhodes, Cnidus, Cos and Sinope.

== Religion ==
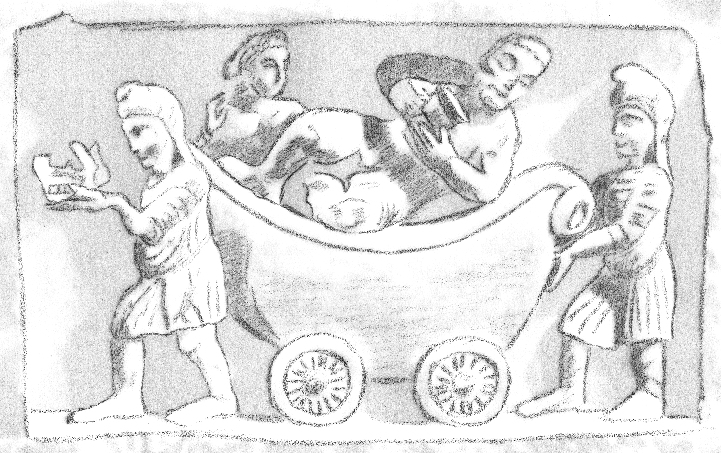
Indo-Scythians pushing the Greek god Dyonisos with Ariadne in a chariot.

The religious beliefs of the Scythians are not fully understood by historians however many believe they were polytheists, with a belief in the afterlife. This is evidenced by the grave goods found in burial sites, such as group burials found within the catacombs located in the Eastern Necropolis in Scythian Neapolis. These catacombs were structured in terms of wealth, with the ‘deepest and richest…to shallower ones with a smaller range of objects’ being found. The types of grave goods found within these burials include handmade pottery, knives, jewellery such as small rings and beads, earrings and small bells and pendants.

== Architecture ==
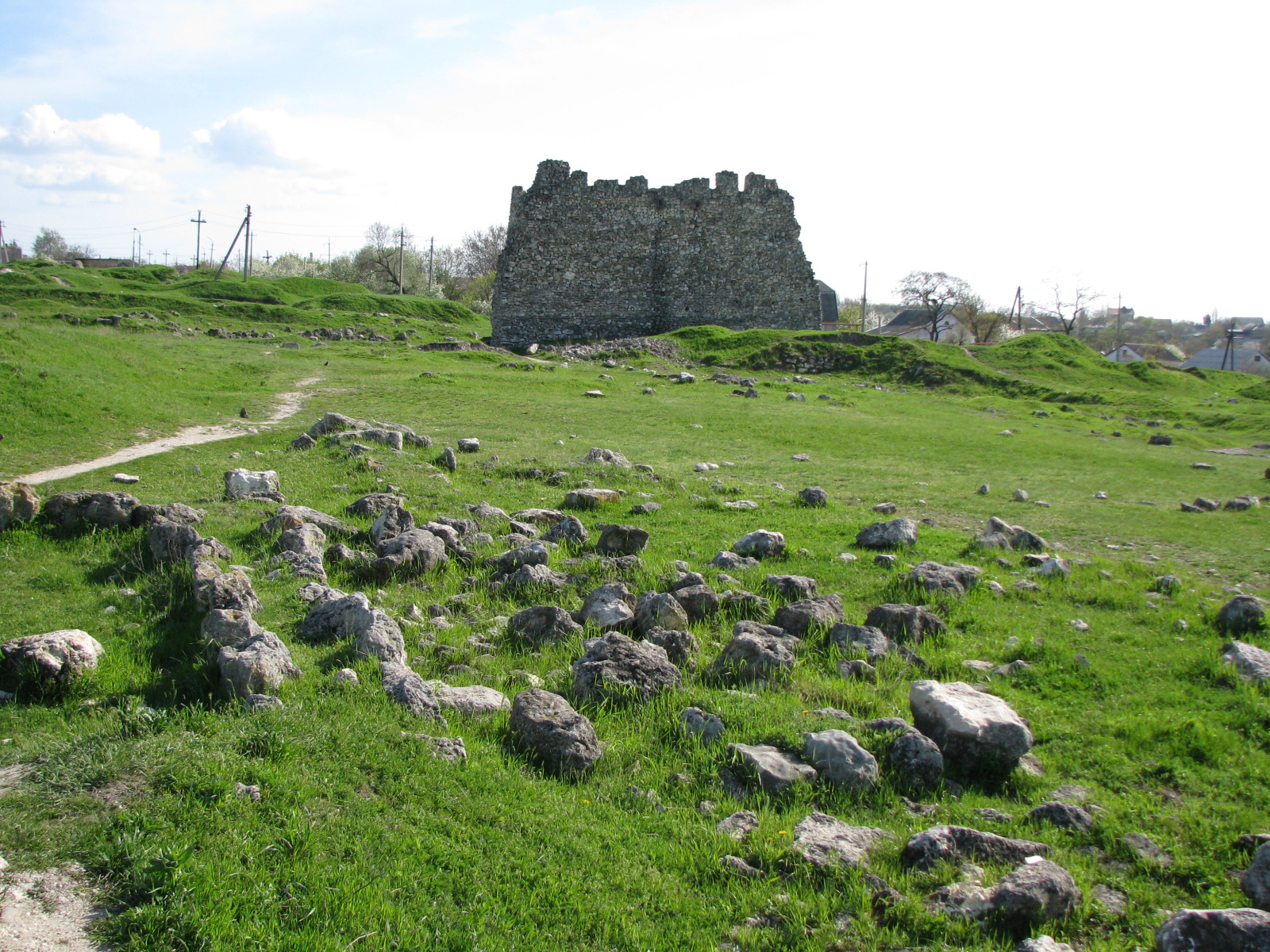
Scythian Neapolis, 2008

During the Scythian period a large stone wall surrounded the settlement as a defence method against the Sarmatians and had a large gate, flanked by two defence towers. Inside the walls Scythian Neapolis had public buildings, which were influenced, to varying degrees, by Greek architecture as well as construction methods and is demonstrated through the buildings with the archaeological features of columns with capitals, painted plaster, statues and tiled roofs. The residential section was located in the northern part of the town, with small houses for families of a medium income being the most common and houses belonging to rich families being scarce. Over the different periods of time that the Scythian’s occupied this settlement was destroyed multiple times, some by fires but also by Mithradates’ general Diophantos.

Zaytsev (2004) cites Kryzhitsky (1993) by stating that the architecture present in Scythian Neapolis had a ‘mix of Greek/Barbarian building traditions' during the Hellenistic period. The techniques during this time were ‘relatively primitive’, with materials such as unfired bricks, timber, limestone, and clay being primary ones. Building techniques for dwellings/houses and the defensive walls didn’t differ during this period, with the absence of skilled masons and carpenters is identified through ‘surface and level variances’. The exception to this is the Southern Palace, with parameters of the megaron suggesting a two-storey construction and archaeological evidence illustrating a tiled roof and thick walls. Further construction phases used materials such as ‘well-processed limestone slabs and blocks’ and significant Southern Palace buildings, such as the heroon of Argotus, Mausoleum of Skiluros and Monumental Southern Façade, were professionally built to Greek architectural standards.

Over time, the architectural techniques in Scythian Neapolis scarcely evolved with the palace complexes receiving more sophisticated materials, such as bronze and marble, in comparison to the dwellings and granaries where ‘a steep decline of architectural and building skills’ was observed. This could be a result of the changing circumstances of the individuals residing in Scythian Neapolis, as the barbarian population experienced major changes before the settlement was destroyed.

== Major sites ==
=== The Mausoleum of King Skiluros ===
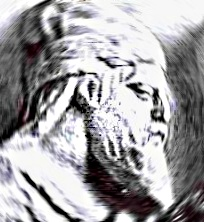
The Scythian King Skiluros, relief from Scythian Neapolis, Crimea, 2 BCE

The mausoleum of King Skiluros was first excavated in 1946 by P.N. Schulz, N.N. Pogrebova, O.I. Dombrovsky, E.A. Bolotnikova, A.N. Karasev, Kh.I. Kris, T.Ya Kobetz, V.A. Golovkina, and T.A. Globenko. Constructed circa 115 BCE near the central gates it was the second mausoleum built in Scythian Neapolis and its location was beyond the walls of Scythian Neapolis. Skiluros’ body was laid on the crypt floor with the head being dressed in a ‘semi-spherical cap ornamented with gold plaques. Several silver and bronze broaches placed on his chest before falling to the pelvis area and an iron helmet was also excavated but its original location is unknown. There has been academic contention over the meaning of lines 4-8 from an inscription found within the mausoleum with some historians believing that those lines were describing Argotas, not King Skiluros.

=== The Argotas mausoleum ===
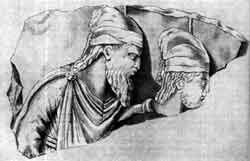
Relief of Skiluros and Palacus

This mausoleum was built before the mausoleum of Skiluros, with excavations undertaken in 1999. It was built after the city destroying fire of 128 BC, alongside the palace, and is one the structures that illustrate the Greek influence over architecture with Doric capitals and many Greek reliefs, sculptures, inscriptions and architectural details being found within the mausoleum. This structure provided new insights into the Scythian noble Argotas and Late Scythian history. It was square in shape, built near the royal palace and the majority of reliefs and sculptures were found here. Historians, such as Ivantchik (2019), have theorised that because this structure was built, Argotas has a major role within the settlement and Scythian nobility at the time. An inscription, specifically lines 4-8, found within the Mausoleum has stimulated an academic debate amongst historians with some believing it was about King Skiluros whilst others suggest the epitaph was about Argotas, an individual and part of the Scythian nobility. Makarov (2019) states that Argotas came from the ruling class of Scythians and reflects the close relationship between the royal families of Bosporus and Scythia during the second half of the 2nd century BC. This inscription provides evidence that the King of Neapolis Scythian regarded themselves as the ruler of Scythia as well as indicating a focus of the external policies in Scythia which was maintaining ‘friendly relations’.
