= Skilurus =

Ancient Scythian king of Crimea

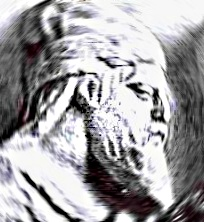
- Relief of Skilurus in Scythian Neapolis
- Reign: 2nd century BC
- Successor: Palacus
- Burial: Scythian Neapolis
- Issue: Palacus, unnamed others

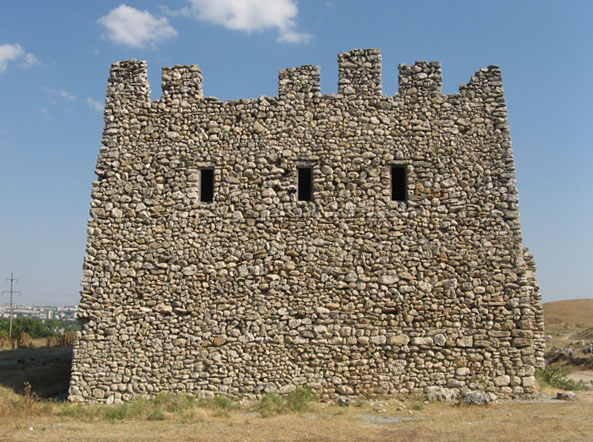
The supposed tomb of Skilurus in Scythian Neapolis

Skilurus (Ancient Greek: Σκίλουρος, romanized: Skílouros; Latin: Scilurus) was a renowned Scythian king reigning during the 2nd century BC. His realm included the lower reaches of the Borysthenes and Hypanis, as well as the northern part of Crimea, where his capital, Scythian Neapolis, was situated.

Skilurus ruled over the Tauri and controlled the ancient trade emporium of Pontic Olbia, where he minted coins. In order to gain advantage against Chersonesos, he allied himself with the Sarmatian tribe of Rhoxolani. In response, Chersonesos forged an alliance with Mithridates VI of Pontus. Skilurus died during a war against Mithridates, a decisive conflict for supremacy in the Pontic steppe. Soon after his death, the Scythians were defeated by Mithridates (ca. 108 BC). Either Skilurus or his son and successor Palacus were buried in a mausoleum at Scythian Neapolis; it was used from ca. 100 BC to ca. 100 AD.

Pseudo-Plutarch, in Sayings of Kings and Commanders, reports the following version of the Aesopic fable "The Old Man and his Sons": "Scilurus on his death-bed, being about to leave eighty sons surviving, offered a bundle of darts to each of them, and bade them break them. When all refused, drawing out one by one, he easily broke them; thus teaching them that, if they held together, they would continue strong, but if they fell out and were divided, they would become weak." cf. "Unity makes strength”.
