= Kizil-Koba culture =

Middle Paleolithic culture in Crimea

The Kizil-Koba culture is a Bronze age culture belonging to a people who lived in the 9th–3rd century BC in the Eastern Crimean territory and ancestral to Tauri. The culture is represented by the materials from the Kizil-Koba cave in the foothills of the Crimean Mountains in the East Crimea.

The similarity between the Kizil-Koba culture and the Koban culture created by the Cimmerian tribes in the Caucasus leads to suppose that the Kizil-Koba culture emerged in the Caucasus.

== Kizil-Koba Cave ==
Kizil-Koba (The Krasnaya Cave -literally translates as the Red Cave) is the biggest grotto of the Crimea and one of the karst cave that appear on the limestone in Eastern Europe.

== See also ==
- History of Crimea
- List of caves
