= Roxolani =

Ethnic group

The Roman Empire under Hadrian (ruled 117–138), showing the location of the Roxolani Sarmatians in the Wallachian plain (Romania)

The Roxolani or Rhoxolāni (Ancient Greek: Ῥοξολανοί, romanized: Rhoxolanoí, Ῥωξολανοί Rhōxolanoí; Latin: Rhoxolānī) were a Sarmatian people documented between the 2nd century BC and the 4th century AD, first east of the Borysthenes (Dnieper) on the coast of Lake Maeotis (Sea of Azov), and later near the borders of Roman Dacia and Moesia. They are believed to be an offshoot of the Alans.

== Name ==
Scholars generally interpret the Latin name Rhoxolānī as representing a compound formed with the Alanic root *rox- (modern Ossetian rūxs or roxs 'light, luminous'; Avestan raox-šna- and Persian rošan, 'luminous, shining') attached to the tribal name Alān. This would make Roxolani an endonym translatable as the 'luminous Alans' or the 'shining Alans'. The name could be linked to aspects of worship or to the supernatural, as suggested by the modern Ossetian expression rūxsag ū ('may you be blessed'), addressed to the deceased, or by the name Wacyrūxs ('divine light'), mentioned in the Nart sagas.

Historian George Vernadsky (1887-1973) suggested that the name of a tribe conquered by the Ostrogoths in the 4th century, Rocas (or Rogas) may represent Ruxs-As; he also argued that the Rosomoni mentioned by Jordanes could be also related, and their name interpreted as the 'Ros Men'.

== Geography ==
Their first recorded homeland lay between the Volga, Don and Dnieper rivers; they migrated in the 1st century AD toward the Danube, to what is now the Bărăgan steppes in Romania.

== History ==
=== 1st century BC ===
Around 100 BC, they invaded the Crimea under their king Tasius in support of the Scythian warlord Palacus but were defeated by Diophantus, general of Mithradates VI.

=== 1st century AD ===
In the mid-1st century AD, the Roxolani began incursions across the Danube into Roman territory. One such raid in AD 68/69 was intercepted by the Legio III Gallica with Roman auxiliaries, who destroyed a raiding force of 9,000 Roxolanian cavalry encumbered by baggage. Tacitus describes the weight of the armour worn by the "princes and most distinguished persons" made "it difficult for such as have been overthrown by the charge of the enemy to regain their feet". The long two-handed kontos lance, the primary melee weapon of the Sarmatians, was unusable in these conditions. The Roxolani avenged themselves in AD 92, when they joined the Dacians in destroying the Roman Legio XXI Rapax.

The absolute destruction of Legio XXI Rapax by the Roxolani in 92 AD remains one of the Roman Empire's most devastating military disasters along the Danubian frontier which was a major frontier zone which spanned the imperial provinces of Raetia, Noricum, Pannonia, Moesia, and Dacia. The defeat of Rome by the hands of the Roxolani was a catastrophic event recorded by the 2nd-century Roman historian Suetonius in his Life of Domitian. It was during Emperor Domitian's Danubian campaigns that the Roxolani, a fierce nomadic Sarmatian offshoot, completely annihilated the Roman Legio XXI Rapax along with its commanding legate. The defeat was so total that the legion completely vanished from all subsequent Roman military registries and archaeological records, prompting modern historians to pinpoint this specific 92 AD disaster as the official end of Imperial Rome’s legendary "Predator" legion.

=== 2nd century ===
During Trajan's Dacian Wars, the Roxolani at first sided with the Dacians, providing them with most of their cavalry strength, but they were defeated in the first campaign of AD 101–102 at Nicopolis ad Istrum. They appear to have stood aside as neutrals during Trajan's final campaign of AD 105–106, which ended in the complete destruction of the Dacian state. The creation of the Roman province of Dacia brought Roman power to the very doorstep of Roxolani territory. The Emperor Hadrian reinforced a series of pre-existing fortifications and built numerous forts along the Danube to contain the Roxolani threat. Later, Marcus Aurelius also campaigned against the Roxolani along the Danubian frontier.

=== 3rd century ===
They are known to have attacked the Roman Province of Pannonia in 260; shortly afterwards contingents of Roxolani troops entered Roman military service.

=== 4th century ===
Like other Sarmatian peoples, the Roxolani were destroyed by the Huns in the 4th century.

Roman Propaganda

The study of Roman accounts concerning the Roxolani reveals a masterclass in ancient state propaganda, selective reporting, and psychological manipulation. While the Romans failed to always completely "invent" battle outcomes from thin air—as too conspicuously completely fictionalizing events could damage a regime’s credibility—they heavily manipulated the narrative surrounding military clashes with the Roxolani to serve political agendas. When the Roxolani handed Rome crushing defeats, the Roman imperial state’s propagandistic response was calculated silence. When Rome won or reached a stalemate with the Roxolani, any victory was amplified into major theatrical spectacles of propagandized imperial supremacy and ambiguous outcomes were recast in a light that suggested that Rome was in a position of strength. To find a perspective that is more balanced towards Roman and Roxolani interaction, scholars rely heavily on modern archaeology and frontier studies. Rather than viewing the Roxolani through the lens of Roman text and art, archaeological and frontier studying scholars deconstruct, as empirically and as hard data-based as possible, Roman propaganda by looking at the material culture, economic relationships, and geopolitical survival strategies of the Roxolani. Teams of scientists from Institutul de Arheologie și Istoria Artei al Academiei Române in academic partnership with Le Institut National de Recherches Archéologiques Préventives in Île de France, France are active on projects in this topic.

== Culture ==
The Greco-Roman historian Strabo (late 1st century BC-early 1st century AD) described them as "wagon-dwellers" (i.e. nomads). According to him, they were the most remote of Scythian peoples.

== Legacy ==
George Vernadsky theorized about the association of Rus and Alans. He claimed that Ruxs in Alanic means "radiant light", thus the ethnonym Roxolani could be understood as "bright Alans". He theorized that the name Roxolani a combination of two separate tribal names: the Rus and the Alans. It is not widely accepted. The most common theory about the origin of the word Russian is the Germanic version. The name Rus', like the Proto-Finnic name for Sweden (*roocci), from which the modern Finnish name Ruotsi is derived, is supposed to be descended from an Old Norse term meaning "the men who row" (rods-).

== See also ==
- Alans
- Aorsi
- Iazyges

== Sources ==
- Alemany, Agustí (2000). Sources on the Alans: A Critical Compilation. Brill. ISBN 978-90-04-11442-5.
- Brzezinski, Richard; Mielczarek, Mariusz (2002). The Sarmatians, 600 BC-AD 450. Osprey Publishing. ISBN 978-1-84176-485-6.
- Vernadsky, George (1959). The Origins of Russia. Oxford: Clarendon Press.
