= Pantikapaion =

Ancient Greek city in Crimea

- Παντικάπαιον (Ancient Greek)
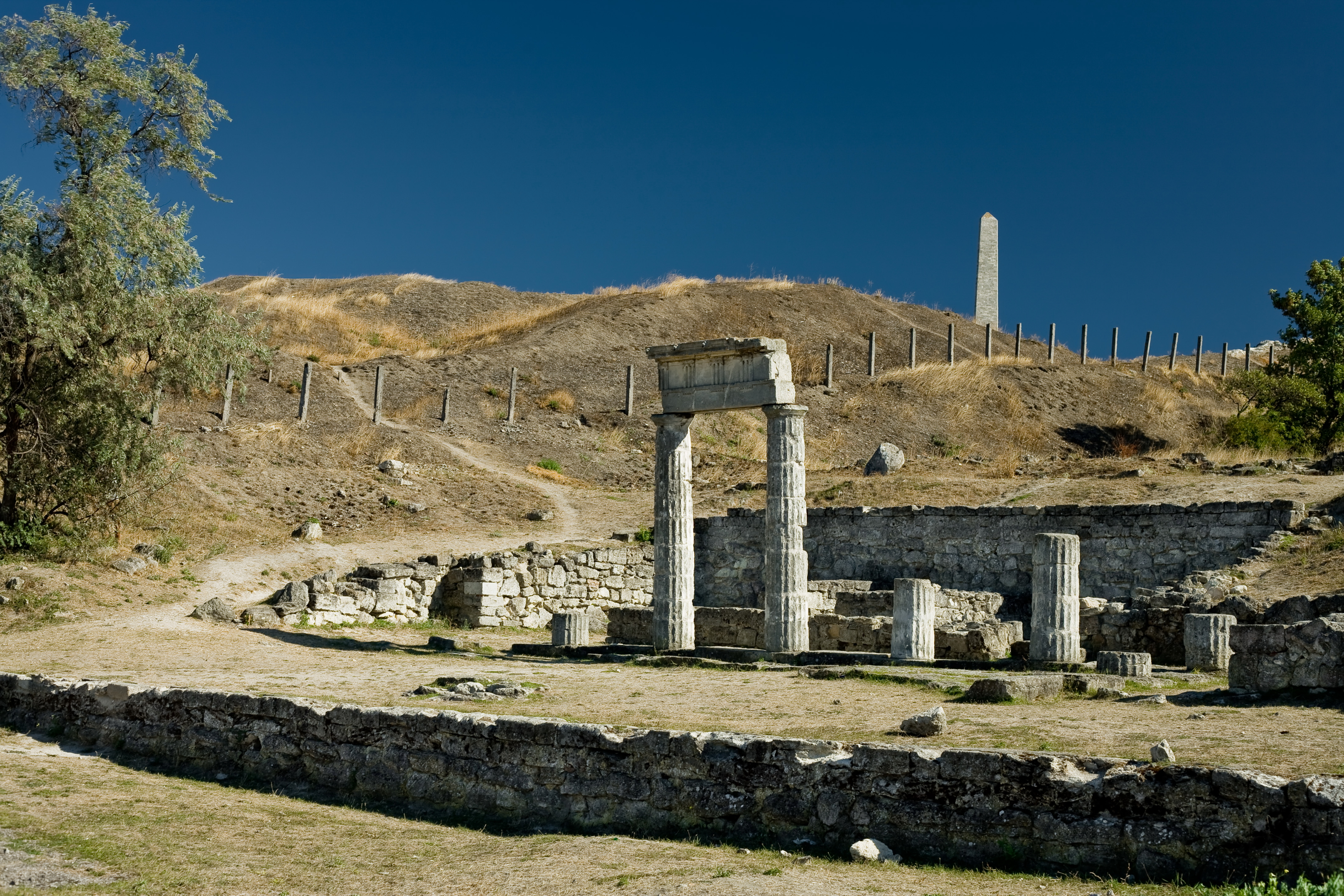
- The prytaneion of Pantikapaion, second century BC. Kerch's Obelisk of Glory is visible in the background.

- Location within Crimea Location within Black Sea
- 45°21′3″N 36°28′7″E
- Type: Settlement
- Periods: Archaic Greek
- Cultures: Greek
- Location: Kerch, Autonomous Republic of Crimea
- Region: Taurica

History
- Built: 7th or 6th century BC
- Built by: Settlers from Miletus
- Abandoned: Approximately 370 AD

Site notes
- Area: 100 ha (250 acres)
- Condition: Ruined
- Owner: Public
- Public access: Yes

Immovable Monument of National Significance of Ukraine
- Official name: Архітектурно-археологічний комплекс "Стародавнє місто Пантікапей" (Architectural and archaeological complex of the Ancient city of Pantikapaion)
- Type: Archaeology
- Reference no.: 010017-Н

Pantikapaion (Ancient Greek: Παντικάπαιον Pantikapaion, from Scythian *Pantikapa 'fish-path'; Latin: Panticapaeum) was an ancient Greek city on the eastern shore of Crimea, which the Greeks called Taurica. The city lay on the western side of the Cimmerian Bosporus, and was founded by Milesians in the late 7th or early 6th century BC, on a hill later named Mount Mithridat. Its ruins now lie in the modern city of Kerch.

== Early existence ==
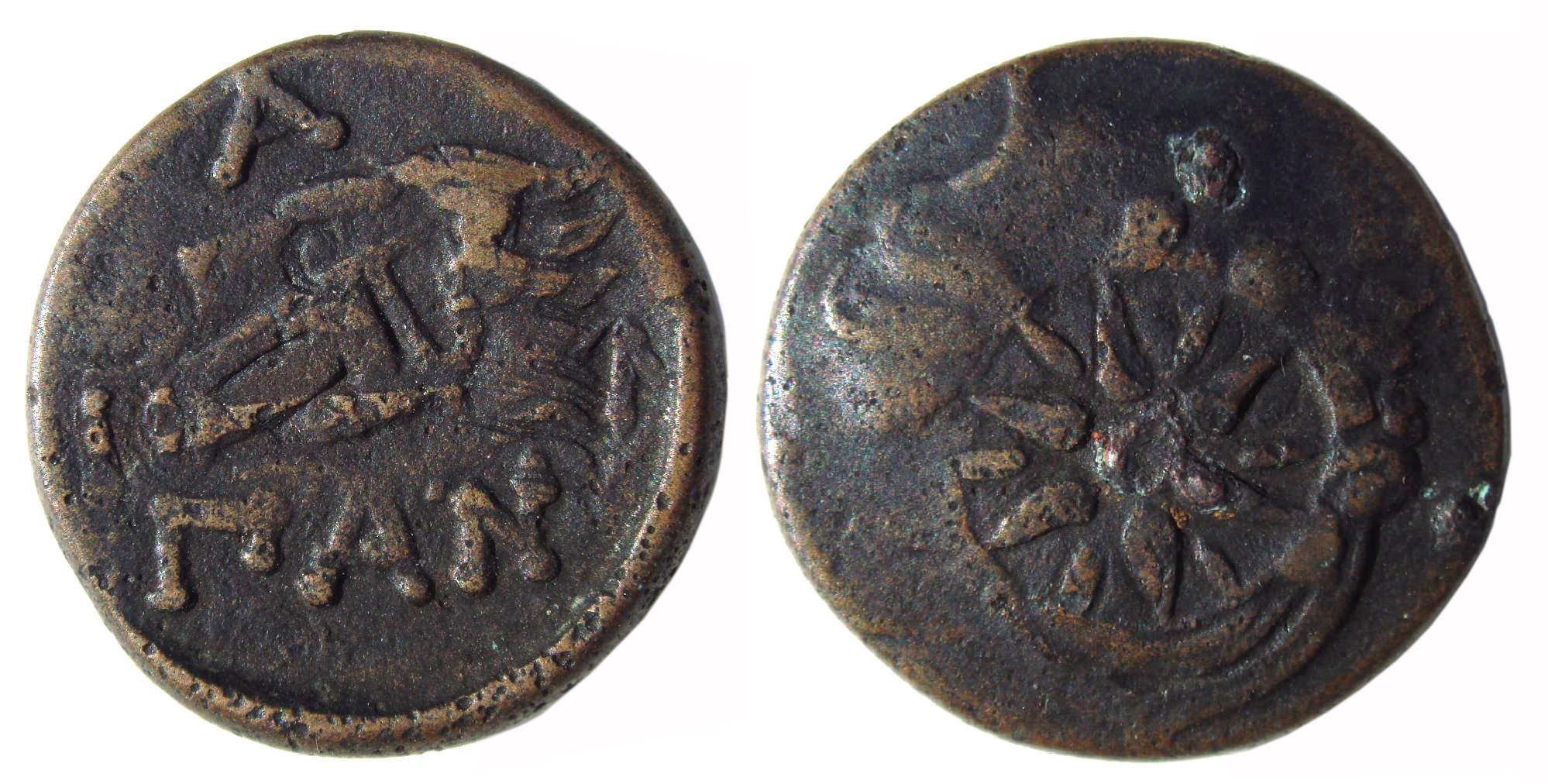
A coin from Pantikapaion, bearing a star inside a diadem and the letters "ΠΑΝ" (Pan), 2nd century BC.

During the first centuries of the city's existence, imported Greek articles predominated: pottery (see Kerch Style), terracottas, and metal objects, probably from workshops in Rhodes, Corinth, Samos, and Athens. Local production, imitated from the models, was carried on at the same time. Athens manufactured a special type of bowl for the city, known as Kerch ware. Local potters imitated the Hellenistic bowls known as the Gnathia style as well as relief wares—Megarian bowls. The city minted silver coins from the 5th century BC and gold and bronze coins from the 4th century BC. At its greatest extent it occupied 100 hectares (250 acres). The Hermitage and Kerch Museums contain material from the site, which is still being excavated.

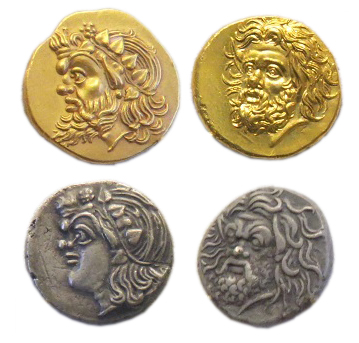
Representations of Pan on 4th century BC gold and silver Pantikapaion coins

== Fifth to first centuries BC ==
In the 5th–4th centuries BC, the city became the residence first of the Archaeanactids and then of the Spartocids, dynasties of Thracian kings of Bosporus, and was hence itself sometimes called Bosporus. Its economic decline in the 4th–3rd centuries BC was the result of the Sarmatian conquest of the steppes and the growing competition of Egyptian grain.

=== Mithridates ===
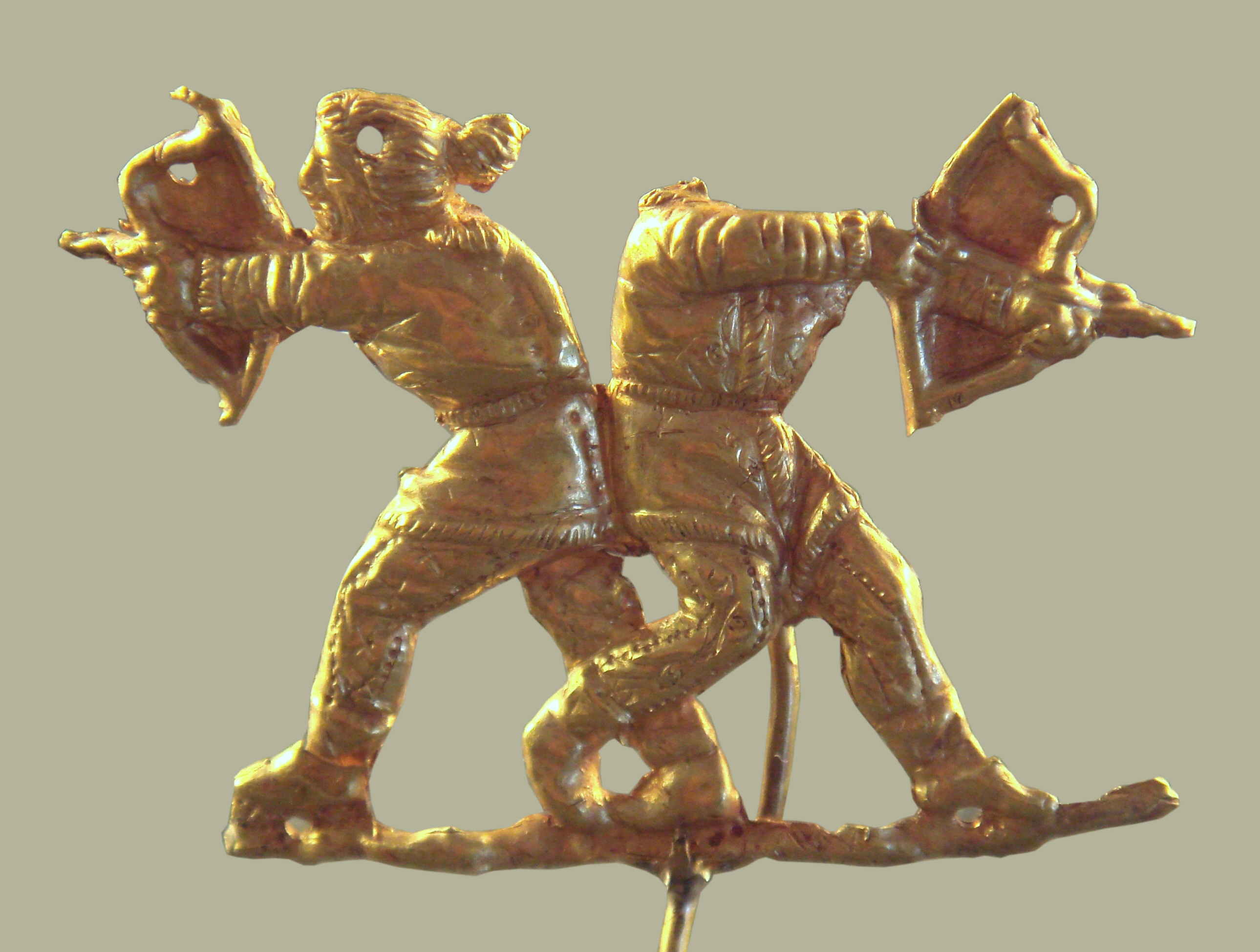
Small statue of Scythians with bows from Panticapeum, 4th century BC

The last of the Spartocids, Paerisades V, apparently left his realm to Mithridates VI Eupator, king of Pontus. This transition was arranged by one of Mithridates's generals, Diophantus, who earlier had been sent to Taurica to help local Greek cities against Palacus of the Scythian kingdom in Crimea. The mission did not go smoothly: Paerisades was murdered by Scythians led by Saumacus, and Diophantus escaped to return later with reinforcements to suppress the revolt (c. 110 BC).

Half of a century later, Mithridates took his life in Pantikapaion, when, after his defeat in a war against Rome, his son and heir Pharnaces and citizens of Pantikapaion turned against him.

== First centuries AD ==
=== Jewish community ===
Several inscriptions dating to the first and second centuries AD mention the local synagogue (sometimes described as belonging jointly to Jews and God-fearers) is named as the supervising body for the legal transaction of freedom. A 3rd-century Hebrew funerary inscription for an individual named Isaac includes a blessing for peace; this inscription was cited by archaeologist Anna Collar as evidence of a broad resurgence in the use of the Hebrew language among the Jewish diaspora during the 2nd and 3rd centuries AD. From this same period, examples of menorah imagery appear alongside Hebrew names such as Seimon and Samouelos.

== See also ==
- Bosporan Kingdom
