= Palacus =

King of Crimean Scythia

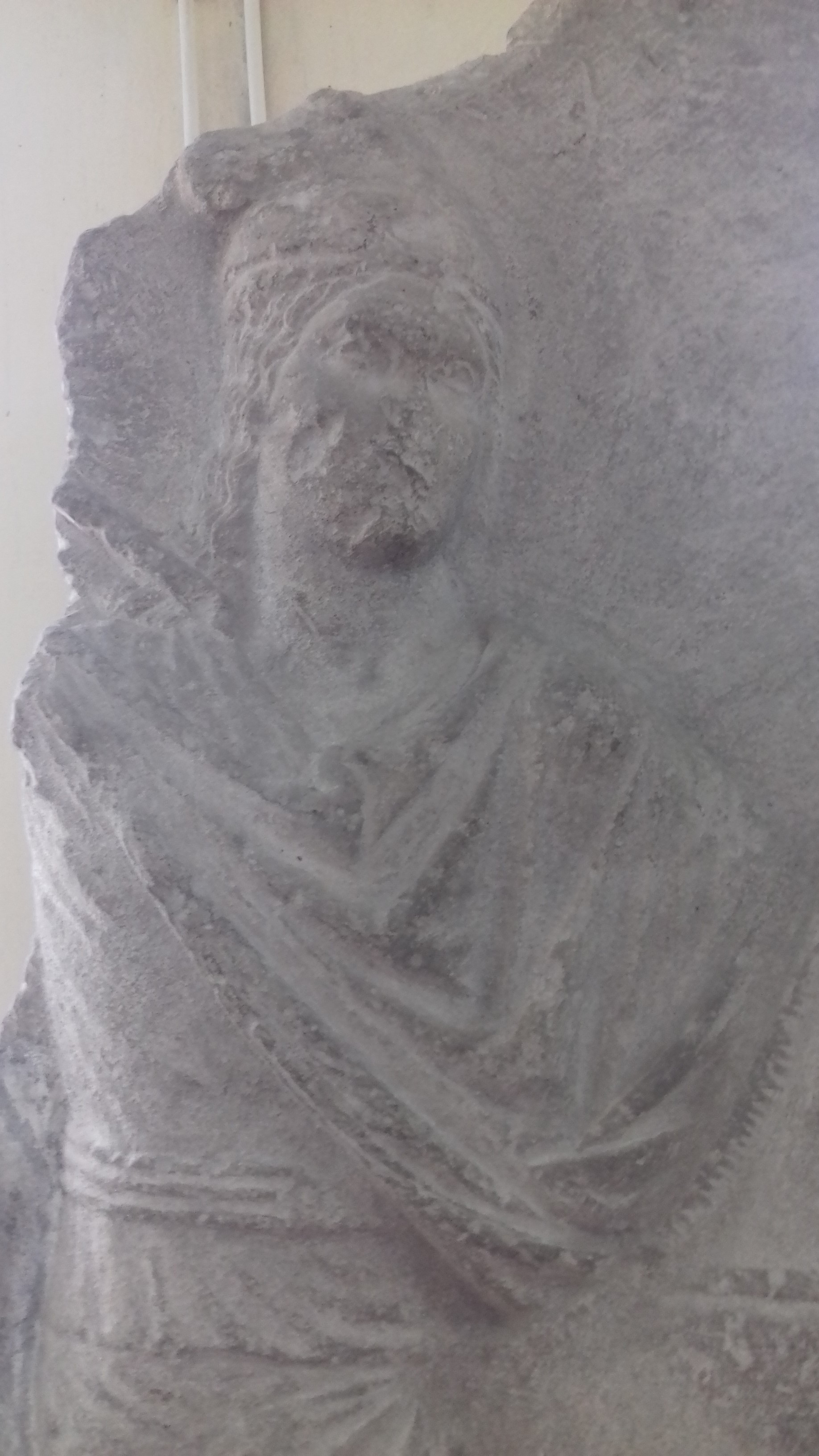

Palacus (Ancient Greek: Πάλακος, romanized: Pálakos; Latin: Palacus) was the king of Crimean Scythia Minor who succeeded his father, Skilurus. Resuming the latter's war against Mithridates VI, he attempted to besiege Chersonesos but was defeated by Pontic forces under Diophantus. Enlisting the assistance of the Rhoxolani under Tasius, Palacus launched an invasion of the Crimea. The invaders were defeated by Diophantus and accepted Mithridates as their overlord. Palacus was the last Scythian king whose name is attested in classical sources.
