= Tauri =

Ancient people inhabiting Crimea in the 1st millennium BC

Map of the Roman Empire under Hadrian (ruled 117–38 AD), showing the location of the Chersonnesos Taurike (Crimean peninsula), the home of the Tauri

The Tauri (/ˈtaʊəri/; Ταῦροι in Ancient Greek), or Taurians, also Scythotauri, Tauri Scythae, Tauroscythae (Pliny, H. N. 4.85) were an ancient people settled on the southern coast of the Crimean peninsula, inhabiting the Crimean Mountains in the 1st millennium BC and the narrow strip of land between the mountains and the Black Sea. According to the sources, the Tauri were the first inhabitants of the Crimean peninsula and never abandoned its borders. They gave their name to the peninsula, which was known in ancient times as Taurica, Taurida and Tauris.

== Assimilation ==
Taurians intermixed with the Scythians starting from the end of 3rd century BC, and were mentioned as Tauroscythians and Scythotaurians in the works of ancient Greek writers. The Taurians underwent the rule of the Bosporan Kingdom from the 5th century BC. As a result of Roman occupations, Taurians were romanized in the first century AD. Later the Taurians were subsumed by the Alans and Goths, and existed till the 4th century.

== History ==
In his Histories, Herodotus describes the Tauri as living "by plundering and war". They became famous for their worship of a virgin goddess, to whom they sacrificed shipwrecked travellers and waylaid Greeks. He makes a point of them living in Scythia geographically without themselves being Scythians. In Geographica, Strabo refers to the Tauri as a Scythian tribe.

The Greeks identified the Tauric goddess with Artemis Tauropolos or with Iphigeneia, daughter of Agamemnon. The Tauric custom of human sacrifice inspired the Greek legends of Iphigeneia and Orestes, recounted in Iphigeneia in Tauris by the playwright Euripides. The original Greek title given by Euripides literally means Iphigeneia among the taurians. Such a place as "Tauris" does not exist.

According to Herodotus, the manner of their sacrifice was to beat the head with a club and remove the head; then they either buried the body or threw it off a cliff, and lastly nailed the head to a cross. Prisoners of war likewise had their heads removed, and the head was then put onto a tall pole and placed at their house "in order that the whole house may be under their protection".

Although the Crimean coast eventually came to be dominated by Greek (and subsequently Roman) colonies, notably the one at Chersonesos, the Tauri remained a major threat to Greek power in the region. They engaged in piracy against ships on the Black Sea, mounting raids from their base at Symbolon (today's Balaklava). By the 2nd century BC they had become subject-allies of the Scythian king Scilurus.

In the 4th century AD, the historian Ammianus Marcellinus, mentioned the names of the 3 tribes (Arichi, Sinchi, and Napaei) of the Taurians known for their "extraordinary severity".

Taurians also played a major role in the development and settlement of the Kizil-Koban Culture (KKC) in the 8th-4th century BC. Osmolovsky, who conducted a research in the Krasnaya (Red) Cave in 1921, pointed out that the arrowheads, ceramics and necklaces found in the Cave were owned by the Taurians. There are several indications that this culture belongs to the Tauris, such as:

- Firstly, in the written sources of the earlier times than the 2nd century BC, there is no mention of any other society living in the Crimean foothills and mountains apart from the Taurians.
- Secondly, many artifacts found in Taurians territory and cemeteries were also found in the Kizil-Koba sites.

== Language ==
Taurian
- Region: Crimea
- Ethnicity: Tauri
- Language family: unclassified Iranian?

Language codes
- ISO 639-3: None (mis)
- Glottolog: None

The language that the Tauri spoke has remained unclassified, with only a few words known of their language with a Greek pronunciation. Scholars have hypothesized that the Taurians spoke an Alanic language or another Iranian language.

== See also ==
- Tauri and Scythians
- European Scythian campaign of Darius I
- Thoas (king of the Taurians)
