= Ossetians in Turkey =

Турчы ирæттæ; Türkiye’deki Osetler

Total population
- c. 60,000

Regions with significant populations
- Istanbul, Kars, Yozgat

Languages
- Turkish, Iron Ossetian, Digor Ossetian

Religion
- Sunni Islam

Ossetians in Turkey are citizens and denizens of Turkey who are, or descend from, ethnic Ossetians who originate in Ossetia in the Caucasus.

== History ==
An estimated 50,000 Ossetes left the Russian Caucasus during the early 1860s as part of a greater migration of Muslims from the region to the Ottoman Empire due to Russia's activities in the region. Many settled in villages in the eastern district of Sarıkamış, but moved further west following the Russo-Ottoman war of 1877–78. While up to the 1960s there were as many as 60 Ossetian villages in central and eastern Anatolia, due to massive migration to the major cities at present there remain only three: Boyalık, Karabacak and Poyrazlı, all of which are located in the Yozgat district some 200 km east of Ankara. Boyalık has about 30 households, Karabacak 15, and Poyrazlı some 200. The residents of Boyalık and Karabacak speak the Iron dialect of Ossetian, while those of Poyrazlı speak Digor.

The Alan Cultural and Aid Foundation (Alan Kültür ve Yardım Vakfı) was founded in 1989 by Ossetes in Istanbul and Ankara “to secure social solidarity among the Ossetians living in Turkey and… to protect and develop their cultural values”. In 2017 the Alan Vakfı created memorial groves in each of the three remaining Ossetian villages to commemorate the lives of the 186 school children killed in the Beslan massacre in 2004.

At present there are an estimated 60,000 people in Turkey who can claim Ossetian descent, but of these only a few thousand identify as such.

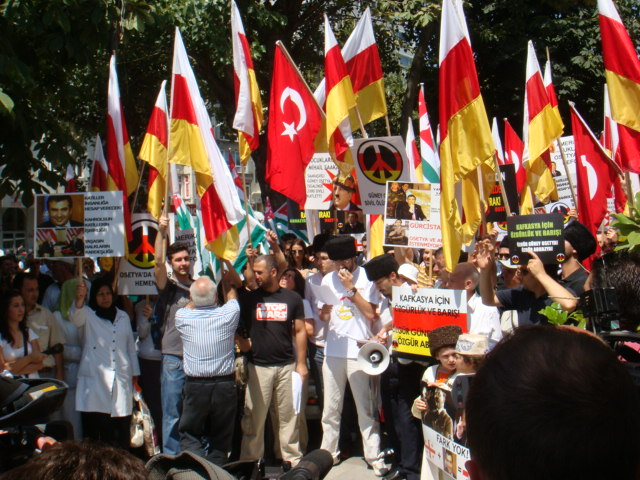
Ossetians and other Caucasian diaspora members protesting against Georgia during the 2008 South Ossetia war (August 13, 2008, Istanbul)

== Religion ==
Ossetians in Turkey are predominantly Sunni Muslim. Due to Islamic influence, they have largely abandoned many of the traditions which are maintained in Ossetia.

== Notable people ==
- Bekir Sami Bey (known as Bekir Sami Kunduh in modern Turkish sources; Ossetian: Къуындыхаты Муссæйы фырт Бечыр; 1867 – 16 January 1933) was a Turkish politician of Ossetian origin. He served as the first Minister of Foreign Affairs of Turkey during 1920–1921.

== See also ==
- Minorities in Turkey
- Abkhazians in Turkey
- Ossetian Muslims
