= Kudar =

Ethnographic group of the Iron people

The Kudar (Iron Ossetic: къуыдайрæгтæ) are an ethnographic group of the Iron people historically occupying Kudar Gorge, located in the northwest of Dzau district of South Ossetia.

They speak Kudaro-Dzau subdialect (one of the subdialects of the Iron dialect of the Ossetic language).

== See also ==
- Ossetians
