= Ossetians =

Ethnic group of the Caucasus

Ирæттæ, Дигорæнттæ / Irættæ, Digorænttæ

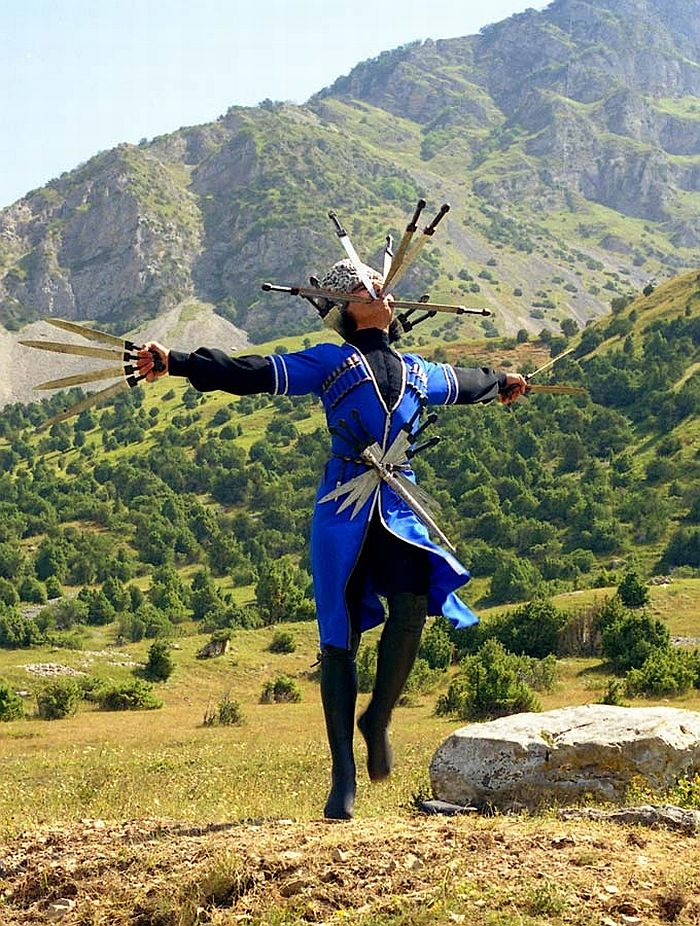
- Ossetian folk dancer in North Ossetia (Russia), 2010

Total population
- c. 900,000

Regions with significant populations
- Russia: 558,515
- (North Ossetia–Alania): 480,310
- South Ossetia: 51,000
- Georgia (excluding South Ossetia P.A.): 14,385
- Turkey: 20,000–50,000
- Tajikistan: 7,861
- Uzbekistan: 5,823
- Ukraine: 4,830
- Kazakhstan: 4,308
- Turkmenistan: 2,066
- Azerbaijan: 1,170
- Kyrgyzstan: 758
- Syria: 700
- Belarus: 554
- Moldova: 403
- Armenia: 331
- Latvia: 285
- Lithuania: 119
- Estonia: 116

Languages
- Ossetian

Religion
- Russian Orthodoxy; Ossetian neopaganism; Islam

Related ethnic groups
- Jasz, Asud, other Iranian peoples, North Caucasian peoples
- a. The total figure is merely an estimation; sum of all the referenced populations.

The Ossetians (Note: /ɒˈsiːʃənz/ oss-EE-shənz or /ɒˈsɛtiənz/ oss-ET-ee-ənz; Iron Ossetic: ир, ирæттæ / дигорӕ, дигорӕнттӕ, romanized: ir, irættæ / digoræ, digorænttæ) also known as Ossetes, (Note: /ˈɒsiːts/ OSS-eets) Ossets (Note: /ˈɒsɪts/ OSS-its) and Alans, (Note: /ˈælənz/ AL-ənz) are an Iranian ethnic group who are indigenous to Ossetia, a region situated across the northern and southern sides of the Caucasus Mountains. They natively speak Ossetian, an Eastern Iranian language of the Indo-European language family, with most also being fluent in Russian as a second language.

Currently, the Ossetian homeland of Ossetia is politically divided between North Ossetia–Alania in Russia, and the de facto country of South Ossetia (recognized by the United Nations as Russian-occupied territory that is de jure part of Georgia). Their closest historical and linguistic relatives, the Jász people, live in the Jászság region within the northwestern part of the Jász-Nagykun-Szolnok County in Hungary. A third group descended from the medieval Alans are the Asud of Mongolia. Both the Jász and the Asud have long been assimilated; only the Ossetians have preserved a form of the Alanic language and Alanian identity.

The majority of Ossetians are Eastern Orthodox Christians, with sizable minorities professing the Ossetian ethnic religion of Uatsdin as well as Islam.

== Name and etymology ==
=== Origin ===
The name Ossetians and Ossetia come from Russian Osetin, which in turn borrowed the Georgian term Oseti (ოსეთი), a toponymic formation meaning 'the land of the Osi'.

In Georgian, Osi (ოსი, pl. Osebi ოსები) has been used since the Middle Ages to refer to the Iranian-speaking population of the central Caucasus, ancestors of the modern Ossetians. The term ultimately derives from the Sarmatian ethnonym As (also attested as Ās in classical and medieval sources), the self-designation of an eastern Iranian tribe belonging to the Alanic branch of the Sarmatians.

The root os/as- is thought to descend from an earlier form *ows/aws-. This is supported by several parallels: the archaic Georgian root ovs- (as in Ovsi, Ovseti), recorded in the Georgian Chronicles; the gemination of s and/or lengthening of the preceding vowel in related forms (Ās, Āṣ in Middle Persian; Aas, Assi in Latin sources); and the Armenian ethnic name Ōsur- (reconstructed as *Awsowrk' ). It appears to be connected to the Jassic term *Jaszok, reflecting descendants of an Alanic branch of the Sarmatians attested near the Caucasus by the 7th century AD.

The ethnonym Iasi (pronounced 'Yazi'), cognate with Hungarian Jász (designating the Jasz people), stems from the Latin Iazyges, itself a rendering of the Sarmatian tribal name *Yazig, used among among western groups related to the Alans. The name is generally traced to the Proto-Iranian root *yaz- ('to worship' or 'to sacrifice'), perhaps originally signifying 'those who perform sacrifices'. In contrast, the broader Sarmatian confederation is thought to have called themselves Arii-tai ('Aryans'). It is speculated that the modern Ossetian endonym Iron, which specifically denotes the main subgroup and dialect of modern Ossetians, is derived from Arii-tai, though this origin is disputed.

=== Modern use ===
Since Ossetian speakers lacked any single inclusive name for themselves in their native language beyond the traditional Iron–Digoron subdivision, these terms came to be accepted by the Ossetians as an endonym even before their integration into the Russian Empire.

This practice was put into question by the new Ossetian nationalism in the early 1990s, when the dispute between the Ossetian subgroups of Digoron and Iron over the status of the Digor dialect made Ossetian intellectuals search for a new inclusive ethnic name. This, combined with the effects of the Georgian–Ossetian conflict, led to the popularization of Alania, the name of the medieval Sarmatian confederation, to which the Ossetians traced their origin and to the inclusion of this name into the official republican title of North Ossetia in 1994.

== Subgroups ==
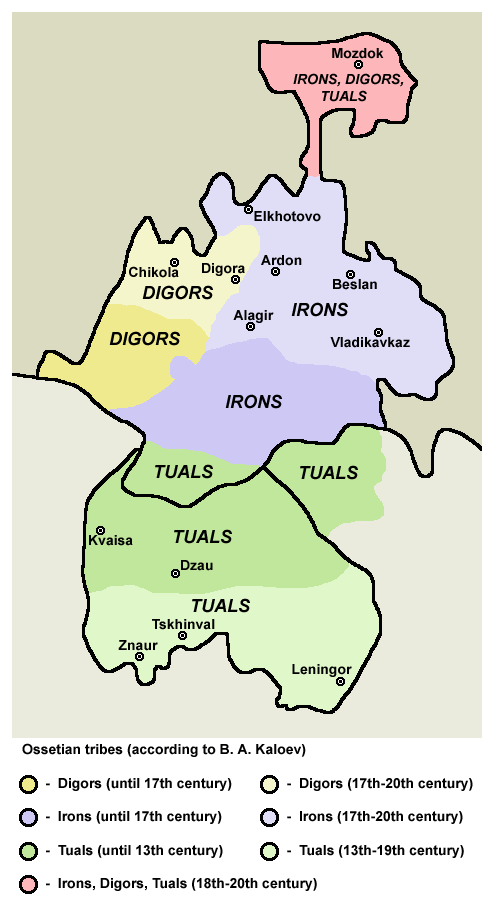
Ossetian tribes (according to B. A. Kaloev).

- Iron in the east and south form a larger group of Ossetians. They speak Iron dialect, which in turn is divided into several subgroups: Alagirs, Kurtats, Tagaurs, Kudar, Tual, Urstual and Chsan.
  - Kudar are the southern group of Ossetians.
  - Tual are in the central part of Ossetia.
  - Ksan are in the east of South Ossetia.
- Digor people in the west. Digors live in Digora district, Iraf district and some settlements in Kabardino-Balkaria and Mozdok district. They speak Digor dialect.
- Iasi, who settled in the Jászság region in Hungary during the 13th century. They spoke the extinct Jassic dialect.
- Asud, a nomadic clan from Mongolia of Alanic-Ossetian origin. They, like the Iasi, thoroughly assimilated, and it is unclear what type of Ossetian dialect they used to speak before adopting the Mongolian language.

== Culture ==
=== Mythology ===
The native beliefs of the Ossetian people are rooted in their Sarmatian origin, which have been syncretized with a local variant of Folk Orthodoxy, in which some pagan gods have been converted into Christian saints. The Narts, the Daredzant, and the Tsartsiat, serve as the basic literature of folk mythology in the region.

=== Music ===
==== Genres ====
Ossetian folk songs are divided into 10 unique genres:

- Historic songs
- War songs
- Heroic songs
- Work songs
- Wedding songs
- Drinking songs
- Humorous songs
- Dance songs
- Romantic songs
- Lyrical songs

==== Instruments ====
Ossetians use the following Instruments in their music:

- String Instruments:
  - Plucked strings:
    - Dyuuadæstænon – a twelve-stringed Harp
    - Fændyr – a Harp with two or three plucked strings
  - Bowed strings
    - Hysyn – two or three string Fiddle
    - Hyyrnæg – is a double-bridged instrument, a kind of Cello
- Wind instruments
  - Uadyndz – Flute
  - Khyozyn – Reed Flute
  - Lalym – Bagpipes
  - Udaevdz – Double-reeds
  - Fidiuæg – some kind of instrument made from a bull's horn
- Percussion instruments
  - Kartsgænæg – Rattles
  - Gymsæg – Drum
  - Dala – Tambourine

== History ==
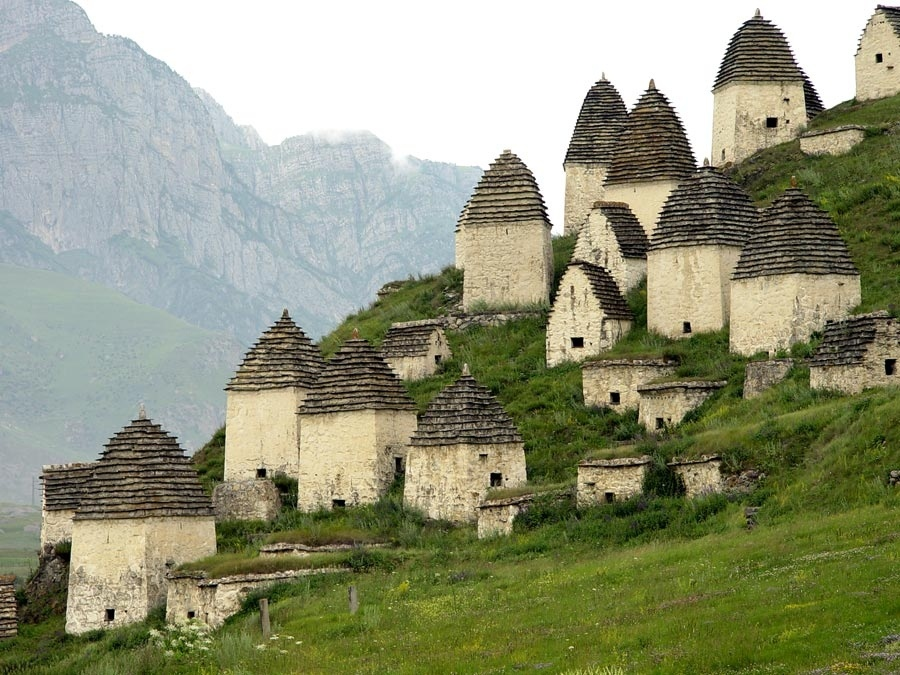
Charnel vaults at a necropolis near the village of Dargavs, North Ossetia

=== Pre-history (Early Alans) ===
The Ossetians descend from the Iazyges tribe of the Sarmatians, an Alanic sub-tribe, which in turn split off from the broader Scythians itself. The Sarmatians were the only branch of the Alans to keep their culture in the face of a Gothic invasion (c. 200 AD) and those who remained built a great kingdom between the Don and Volga Rivers, according to Coon, The Races of Europe. Between 350 and 374 AD, the Huns destroyed the Alan kingdom in the Battle of the Tanais River and the Alan people were split in half. A few fled to the west, where they participated in the Barbarian Invasions of Rome, established short-lived kingdoms in Spain and North Africa, and settled in many other places such as Orléans, France, Iași, Romania, Alenquer, Portugal and Jászberény, Hungary. The other Alans fled to the south and settled in the Caucasus, where they established their medieval kingdom of Alania.

=== Middle Ages ===
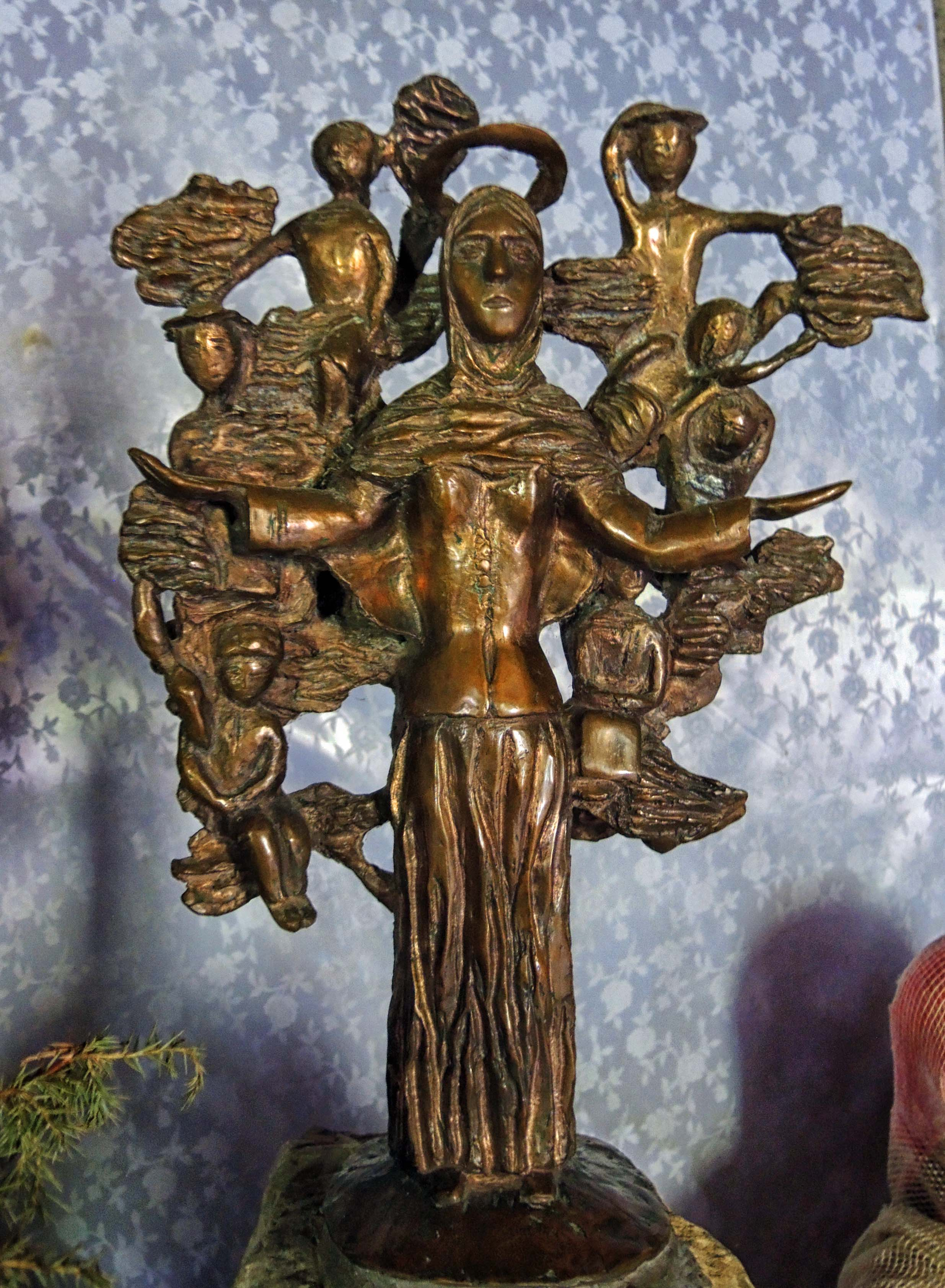
Figurine of "Zadaleski Nana" ("the mother of Zadalesk"), also known as "mother of the Ossetes", who is said to have hid orphaned children in a cave during Timur's invasion in the late 14th century.

In the 7th century, in the well-known chronicle, Ashkharhatsuyts, the Alans were mentioned under the ethnonym Alanac, As-Digor

In the 8th century, a consolidated Alan kingdom, referred to in sources of the period as Alania, emerged in the northern Caucasus Mountains, roughly in the location of the latter-day Circassia and the modern North Ossetia–Alania. At its height, Alania was a centralized monarchy with a strong military force and had a strong economy that benefited from the Silk Road.

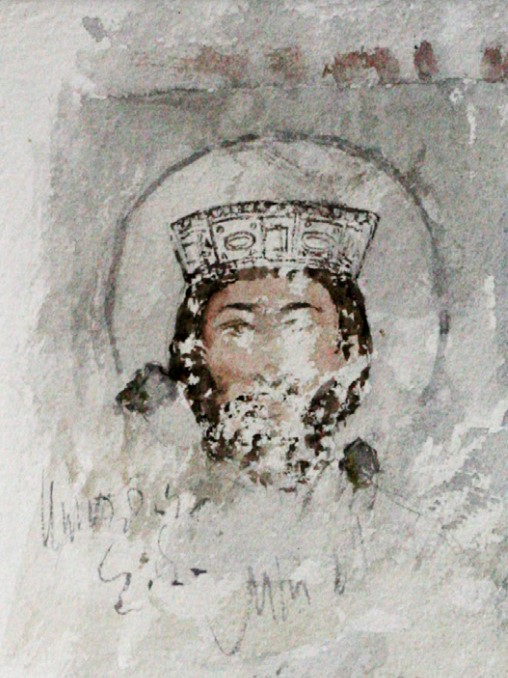
Possible depiction of an 11th-century Alan king, perhaps Durgulel, in the Senty church

Alania reached its peak in the 11th century under the Alanian ruler Durgulel, who established relations with the Byzantine Empire.

Before the Mongol invasion, the Alans lived in the territory between Laba and Argun rivers. In 1220, Genghis Khan sent his commanders Subutai and Jebe on a campaign, ordering them to reach "eleven countries and peoples", among whom were the "Kibchaut" (Kipchaks), "Orusut" (Rus'), "Machjarat" (inhabitants of the city Majar), "Asut" (Alania), "Sessut" (Durdzuks), "Serkessut" (Circassians) and others The Mongols, led by the generals Jebe and Subutai, met the Alans for the first time in 1222 after passing through Shirvan and Dagestan. They were confronted by a Kipchak-Alan alliance, which they defeated by scheming with the Kipchaks.

As a result of the second campaign of 1238-1239, a significant part of the Alania plain was captured by the Mongol Empire, and Alania itself ceased to exist as a political entity.

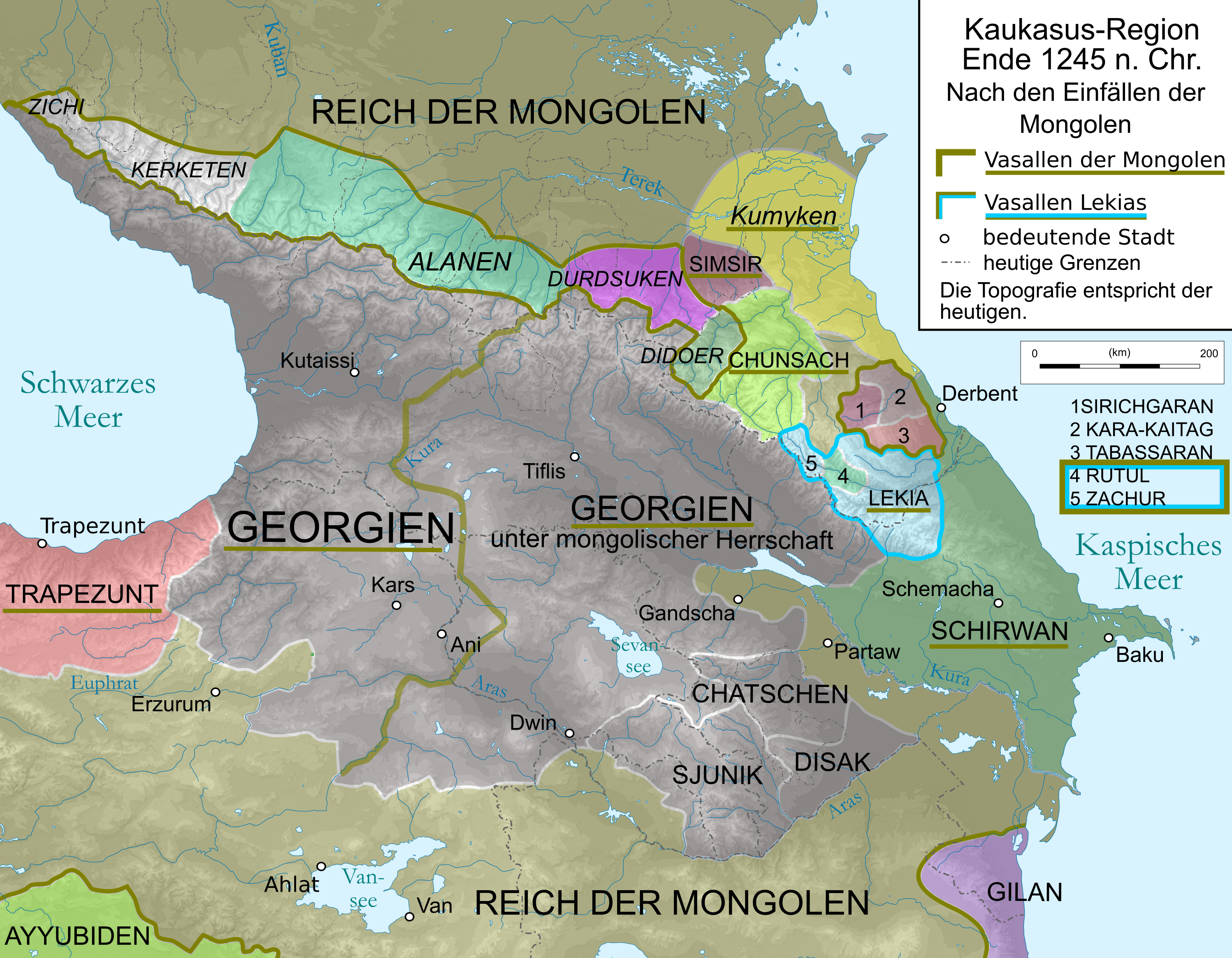
Alania after the Mongol invasion of 1245

After the Mongol invasions of the 1200s, the Alans migrated further into Caucasus Mountains, where they would form three ethnographical groups; the Iron, the Digoron and the Kudar. The Jassic people are believed to be a potentially fourth group that migrated in the 13th century to Hungary.

In 1292, the Alanian king Os-Bagatar attacked the territory of Georgia and captured the territory of Gori, and a significant part of Shida Kartli. He tried to restore the statehood of Alania. But in 1306, Os-Bagatar died, and in 1326, George V of Georgia, after several attempts, was able to take Gori and drive the Alans out of the South Caucasus and Dvaletia.

=== Modern history ===
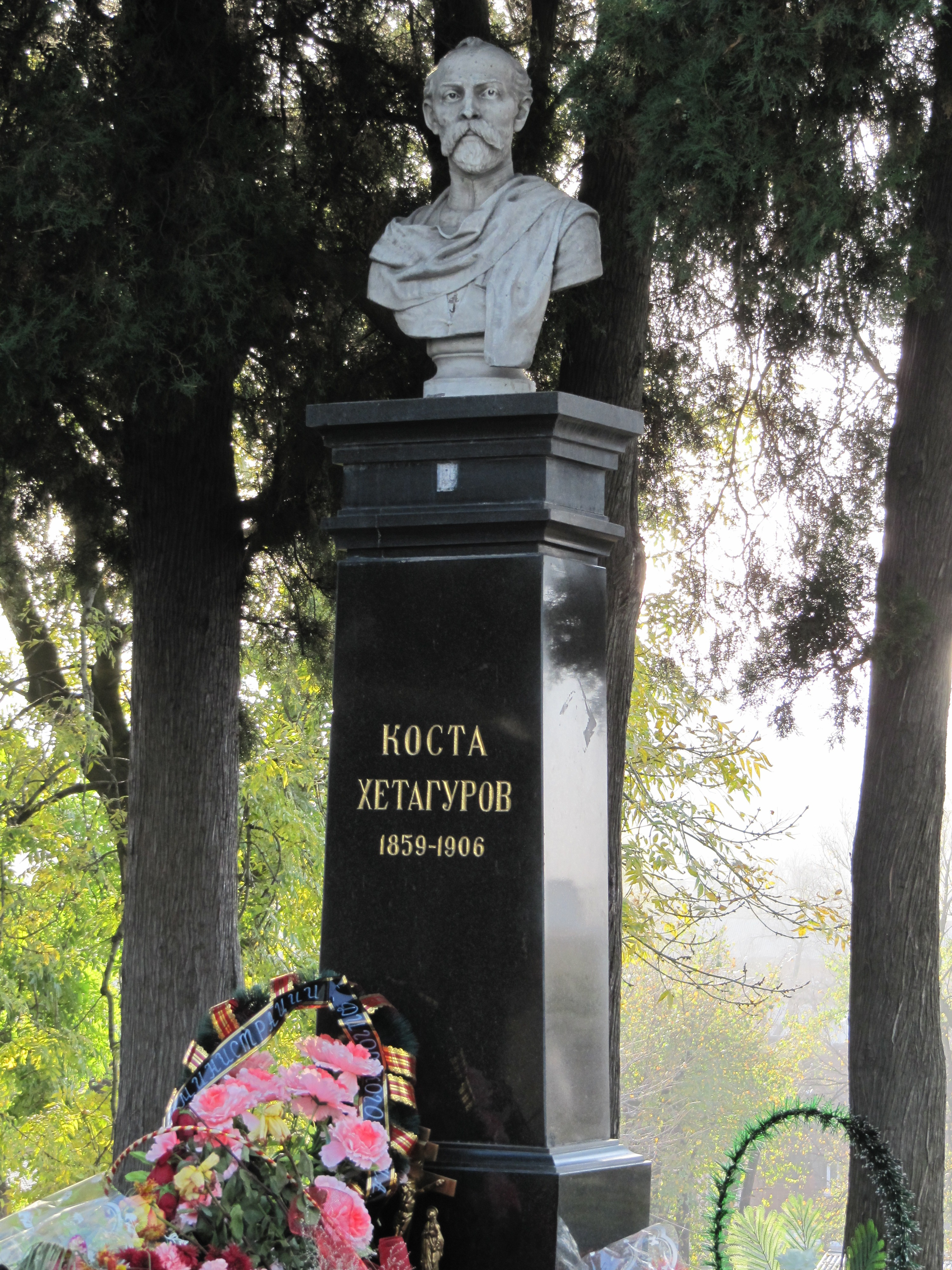
Kosta Khetagurov

In more-recent history, the Ossetians were involved in the Ossetian–Ingush conflict (1992) and Georgian–Ossetian conflicts (1918–1921 Rebellions, First South Ossetia War) and in the Second South Ossetia War between Georgia and Russia.

Key events:

- 1774 — Expansion of the Russian Empire on Ossetian territory.
- 1801 — After Russian annexation of the east Georgian kingdom of Kartli-Kakheti, the modern-day territory of South Ossetia becomes part of the Russian Empire.
- in 1830, the Russian general Paul Andreas von Rennenkampff organized South Ossetian Expedition of 1830. 1,500 Russian troops besieged Ossetian towers in the village of Koshelta, where 30 Ossetian rebels were located.
- 1922 — Creation of the South Ossetian autonomous oblast. North Ossetia remains a part of the Russian SFSR, while South Ossetia remains a part of the Georgian SSR.
- 20 September 1990 – The independent Republic of South Ossetia is formed. Though it remained unrecognized, it detached itself from Georgia de facto. In the last years of the Soviet Union, ethnic tensions between Ossetians and Georgians in Georgia's former Autonomous Oblast of South Ossetia (abolished in 1990) and between Ossetians and Ingush in North Ossetia evolved into violent clashes that left several hundred dead and wounded and created a large tide of refugees on both sides of the border.

Ever since de facto independence, there have been proposals in South Ossetia of joining Russia and uniting with North Ossetia.

== Language ==
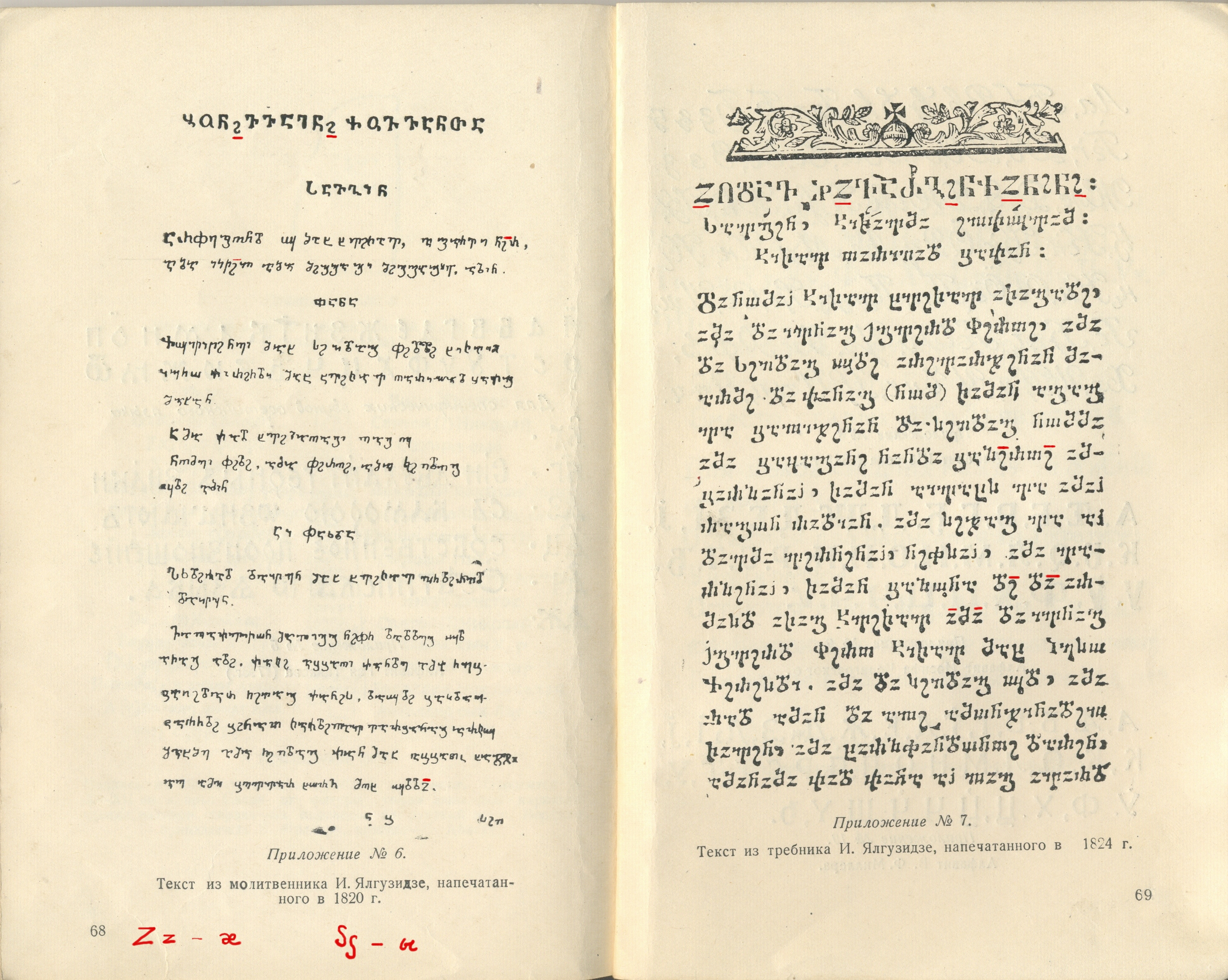
The Ossetian language written in its traditional Khutsuri

The Ossetian language belongs to the Eastern Iranian (Alanic) branch of the Indo-European language family.

Ossetian is divided into two main dialect groups: Ironian (os. – Ирон) in North and South Ossetia and Digorian (os. – Дыгурон) in Western North Ossetia. In these two groups are some subdialects, such as Tualian, Alagirian and Ksanian. The Ironian dialect is the most widely spoken.

Ossetian is among the remnants of the Scytho-Sarmatian dialect group, which was once spoken across the Pontic–Caspian Steppe. The Ossetian language is not mutually intelligible with any other Iranian language.

== Religion ==
Religion in North Ossetia-Alania as of 2012 (Sreda Arena Atlas)
Russian Orthodoxy	49.2%
Assianism and other native faiths	29.4%
Islam	15%
Other Christians	9.8%
Atheism and irreligion	3%
Other Orthodox	2.4%
Protestantism	0.8%
Spiritual but not religious	0.8%
Other and undeclared	0.6%

Prior to the 10th century, Ossetians were strictly pagan, though they were partially Christianized by Byzantine missionaries in the beginning of the 10th century. By the 13th century, most of the urban population of Ossetia gradually became Eastern Orthodox Christian as a result of Georgian missionary work.

Islam was introduced shortly after, during the 1500s and 1600s, when the members of the Digor first encountered Circassians of the Kabarday tribe in Western Ossetia, who themselves had been introduced to the religion by Tatars during the 1400s.

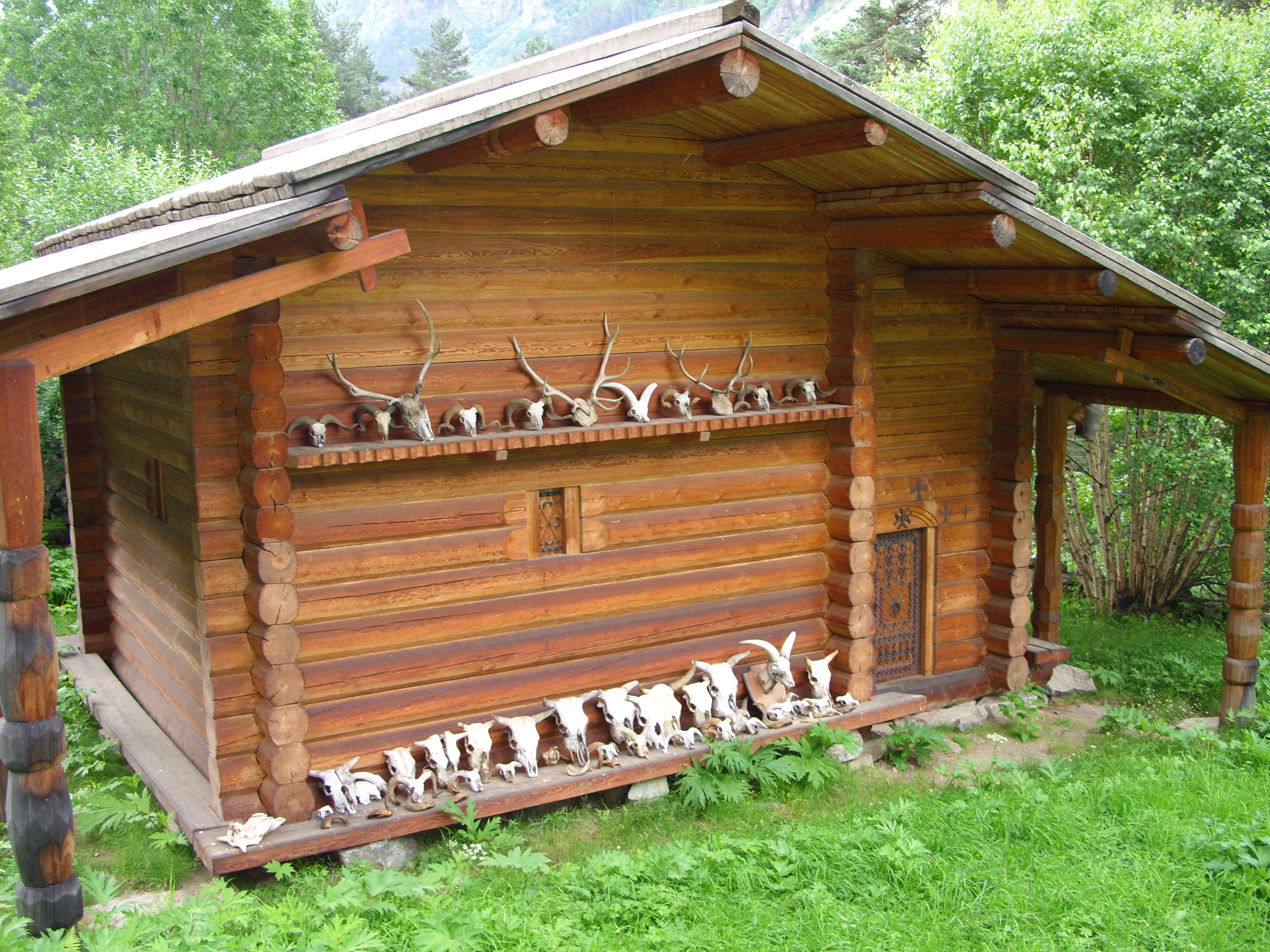
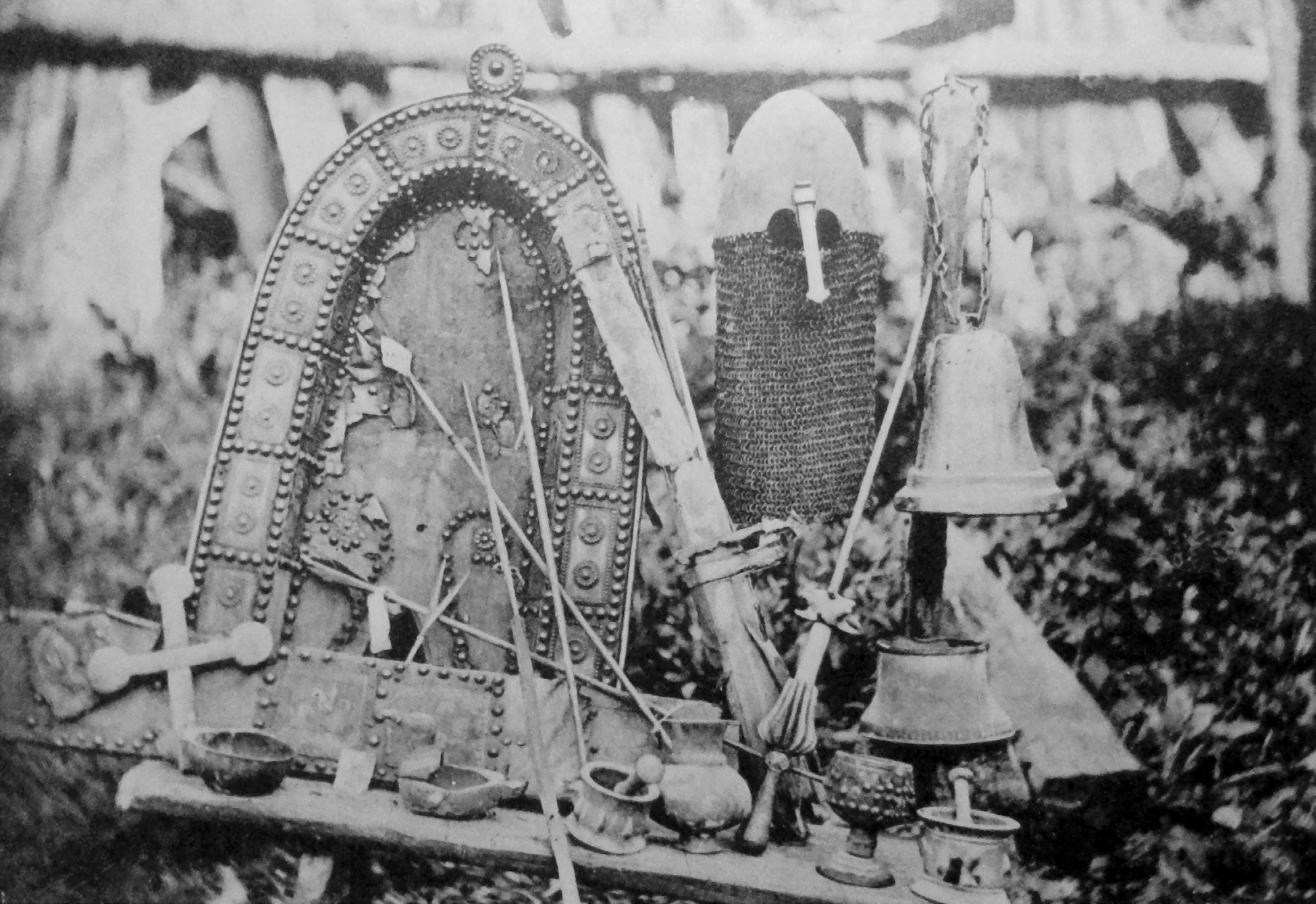
Left: The pagan Rekom shrine, said to be established in the late 14th century Right: Gift offerings from the Rekom shrine

According to a 2013 estimate, up to 15% of North Ossetia’s population practice Islam.

In 1774, Ossetia became part of the Russian Empire, which only went on to strengthen Orthodox Christianity considerably, by having sent Russian Orthodox missionaries there. However, most of the missionaries chosen were churchmen from Eastern Orthodox communities living in Georgia, including Armenians and Greeks, as well as ethnic Georgians. Russian missionaries themselves were not sent, as this would have been regarded by the Ossetians as too intrusive.

Today, the majority of Ossetians from both North and South Ossetia follow Eastern Orthodoxy.

Assianism (Uatsdin or Aesdin in Ossetian), the Ossetian folk religion, is also widespread among Ossetians, with ritual traditions like animal sacrifices, holy shrines, annual festivities, etc. There are temples, known as kuvandon, in most villages. According to the research service Sreda, North Ossetia is the primary center of Ossetian folk religion and 29% of the population reported practicing the folk religion in a 2012 survey. Assianism has been steadily rising in popularity since the 1980s.

== Demographics ==
The first data on the number of Ossetians dates back to 1742. According to the Georgian Archbishop Joseph, the number of Ossetians was approximately 200 thousand.

Outside of South Ossetia, there are also a significant number of Ossetians living in Trialeti, in north-central Georgia. A large Ossetian diaspora lives in Turkey and Syria. About 5,000–10,000 Ossetians emigrated to the Ottoman Empire, with their migration reaching peaks in 1860–61 and 1865. In Turkey, Ossetians settled in central Anatolia and set up clusters of villages around Sarıkamış and near Lake Van in eastern Anatolia. Ossetians have also settled in Belgium, France, Sweden, the United States (primarily New York City, Florida and California), Canada (Toronto), Australia (Sydney) and other countries all around the world.

=== Russian Census of 2002 ===
The vast majority of Ossetians live in Russia (according to the Russian Census (2002)):

- North Ossetia–Alania — 445,300
- Moscow — 10,500
- Kabardino-Balkaria — 9,800
- Stavropol Krai — 7,700
- Krasnodar Krai — 4,100
- (Karachay-Cherkessia) Karachay–Cherkessia — 3,200
- Saint Petersburg — 2,800
- Rostov Oblast — 2,600
- Moscow Oblast — 2,400

== Genetics ==
The Ossetians are a unique ethnic group of the Caucasus, speaking an Indo-Iranian language surrounded mostly by Vainakh-Dagestani and Abkhazo-Circassian ethnolinguistic groups, as well as Turkic tribes such as the Karachays and the Balkars.

=== Haplogroup Studies ===
Like many other ethnolinguistic groups in the Caucasus, the genetic heritage of the Ossetians is both diverse yet distinctive. While Ossetians share genetic traits with neighboring populations, they have retained a distinct identity. With 70% of Ossetian males belonging to the Y-chromosomal haplogroup G2, specifically the G2a1a1a1a1a1b-FGC719 subclade. Among Iron people, this percentage rises to 72.6%, compared to 55.9% among Digor people.

This haplogroup has been identified in Alan burials associated with the Saltovo-Mayaki culture. In a 2014 study by V. V. Ilyinsky on bone fragments from ten Alanic burials along the Don River, DNA analysis was successfully performed on seven samples. Four of these belonged to Y-DNA Haplogroup G2, while six exhibited mitochondrial DNA (mtDNA) haplogroup I. The shared Y-DNA and mtDNA among these individuals suggest they may have belonged to the same tribe or were close relatives. These findings strongly support the hypothesis of direct Alan ancestry for Ossetians. This evidence challenges alternative theories, such as Ossetians being Caucasian speakers assimilated by the Alans, reinforcing that Haplogroup G2 is central to their genetic lineage.

A 2004 study concluded that in the Y-DNA line, North Ossetians are closer to other North Caucasians, while South Ossetians are closer to other South Caucasians. The maternal lines of North and South Ossetians, however, suggest common roots for both, with them being significantly closer to Iranian populations compared to other Caucasians. The researchers suggested that Ossetians have common roots from Iran, followed by subsequent male migrations from their Caucasus neighbours. Additionally, among the tested Caucasus populations, Ossetians were the closest to the Central Asians in the maternal line.

Another study found that, despite the linguistic differences, Ossetians are similar to Svans and Abkhazians in the Y-chromosome, which suggests either a common origin, or an exchange of male lineages.

Y-DNA of Ossetians:

Haplogroup	North Ossetia	South Ossetia
G2a	69.6 %	47.6 %
J2a2*	9,8 %	9,5 %
J2a*	8,3 %	9,5 %
R1b1b2	4,5 %	0 %
J1*	3,7 %	0 %
E1b1b1a	1,5 %	9,5 %
L2	0,7 %	0 %
Q	0,7 %	0 %
C3c	0 %	4,7 %
I2a	0 %	4,7 %
HV1	2,9 %	4,2 %
K*	0 %	4,7 %
R*	0 %	4,7 %
R1a1*	0,7 %	4,7 %

Note: * — Paragroups

The sample size was 132 people for North Ossetia and 21 people for South Ossetia

mtDNA of Ossetians:

Haplogroup	North Ossetia	South Ossetia
H	16 %	8,3 %
J1	9,4 %	4,2 %
K	8,7 %	16,7 %
D	8 %	4,2 %
U5	7,3 %	4,2 %
X	6,5 %	4,2 %
U1A	5,1 %	0 %
HV0	4,4 %	0 %
U3	4,4 %	0 %
T*(xT1)	3,6 %	4,2 %
HV1	2,9 %	4,2 %
J2	2,9 %	0 %
M1	2,9 %	4,2 %
T1A	2,2 %	4,2 %
C	1,5 %	0 %
HV*	1,5 %	4,2 %
N1B	1,5 %	0 %
G	0,7 %	0 %
N9A	0,7 %	0 %
R	0,7 %	0 %
U4	0,7 %	4,2 %
Y	0,7 %	0 %
Z	0,7 %	0 %
I	0 %	4,2 %
T1B	0 %	4,2 %
U	0 %	4,2 %
U7	0 %	8,3 %
HV2	0 %	1,5 %
W	0 %	4,2 %
U2	2,2 %	8,3 %

Note: * — Paragroups

The sample size was 138 people for North Ossetia and 24 people for South Ossetia.

=== Autosomal DNA studies ===
It has been found that the inhabitants of the Caucasus, including Ossetians, show genetic uniformity and trace their ancestry largely to middle eastern ancestors, with minor external impacts.

Ossetians along with the Adyghe populations that were tested appears to have received minor gene flow from South Siberia and Mongolia related populations, suggesting brief genetic interactions with Turkic migrations.

North Caucasians are differentiated from South Caucasians by the admixture from steppe and East Asian populations. The genetic boundary between the North and South Caucasians correlates geographically with the Greater Caucasus range. In areas inhabited by modern Ossetians, this genetic boundary weakens, which the researchers attribute to the narrowing of the range in this region. Furthermore, the researchers found that North Caucasians can be genetically divided into "northwest Caucasus" and "northeast Caucasus," with Ossetians belonging to the former category. The study found that genetic signals associated with Eastern hunter-gatherers are strongest in the northeast Caucasus, while the East Asian signal is strongest in the northwest Caucasus. Researchers have genetically modelled Ossetians as being 69.2% Armenian (proxy for the indigenous populations of the Caucasus), 25.8% Scythian (proxy for the steppe populations), and 5.1% Nanai (proxy for the East Asian populations). The proportion of steppe/Scythian ancestry among Ossetians was lower than that of neighboring North Caucasians, but higher than that of Georgians, whose proportion ranged from 6.8 to 7.9 percent, depending on the genetic model used. The East Asian component among Ossetians was once again attributed to Turkic peoples.

== Gallery ==
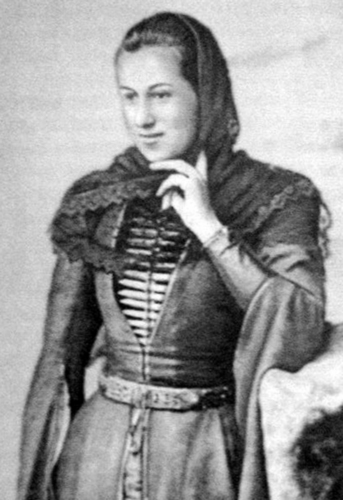
Ossetian woman in traditional clothes, early years of the 20th century

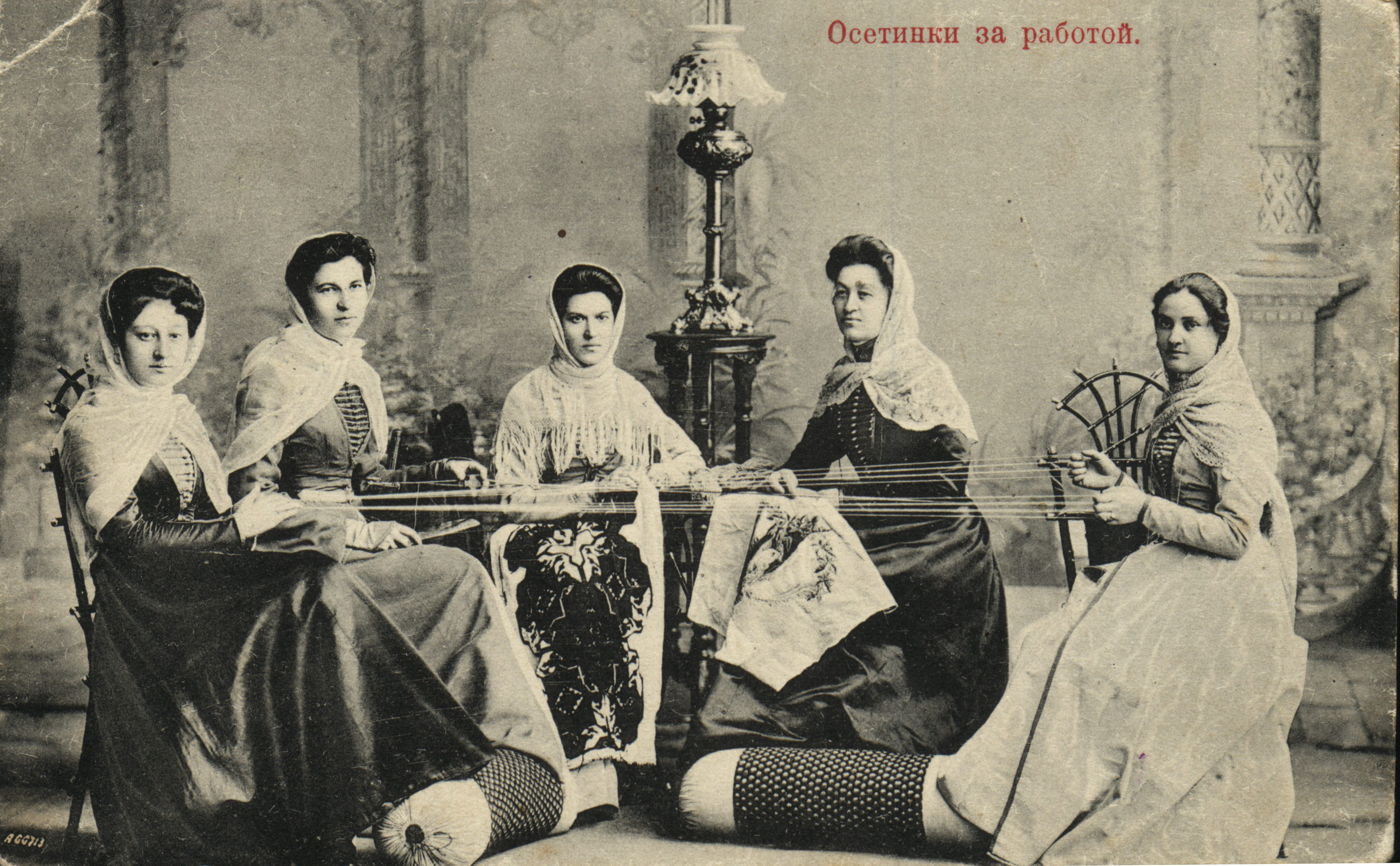
Ossetian women working (19th century)

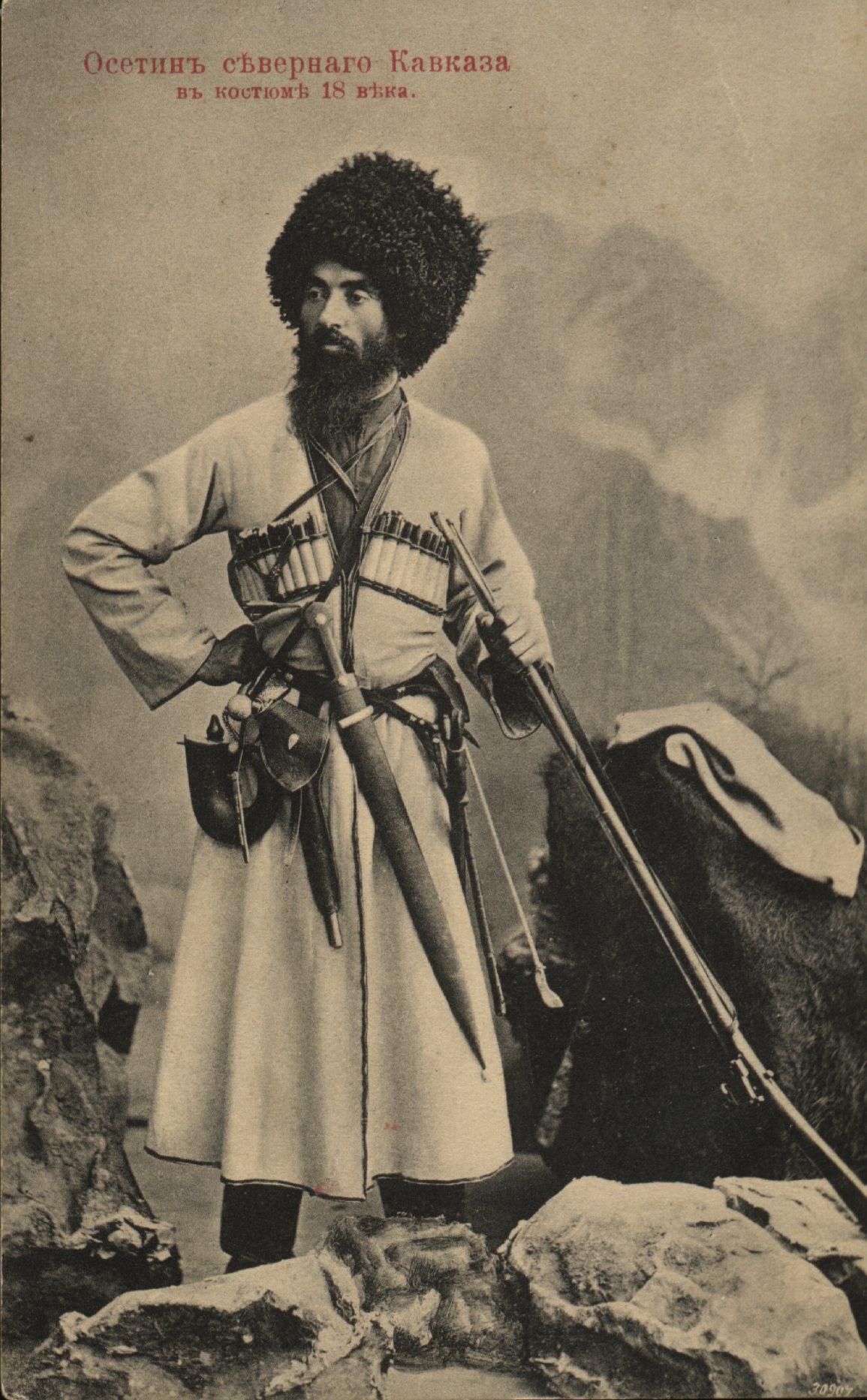
Ossetian traditional dress of the 18th century, Ramonov Vano (19th century)

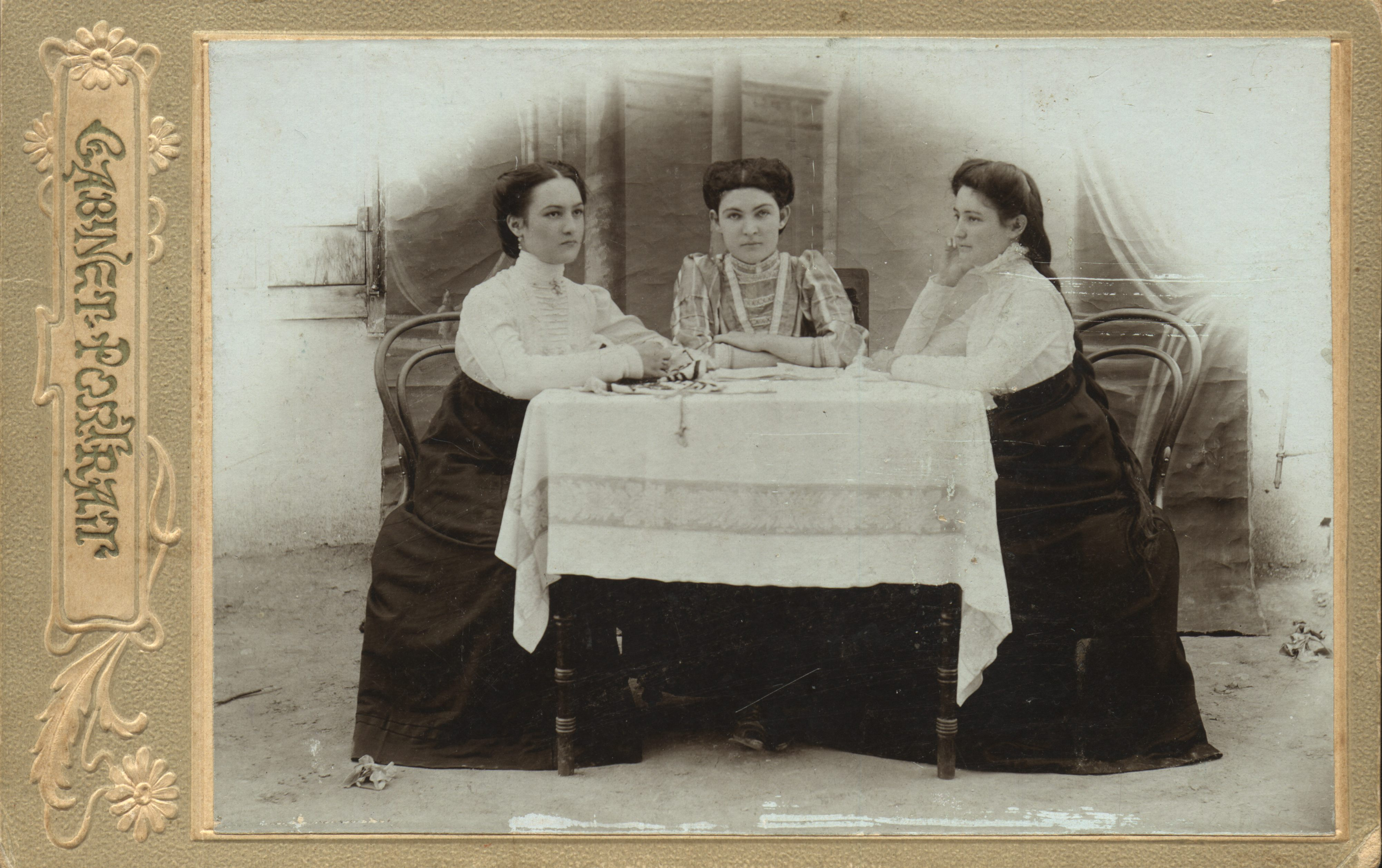
Three Ossetian teachers (19th century)

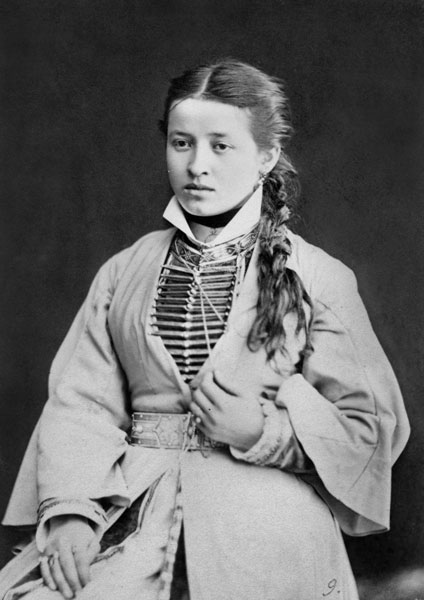
Ossetian girl in 1883

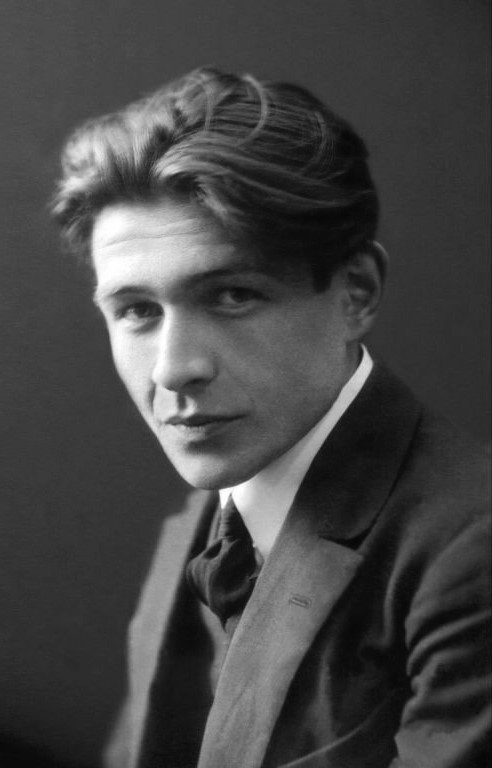
Gaito Gazdanov, writer

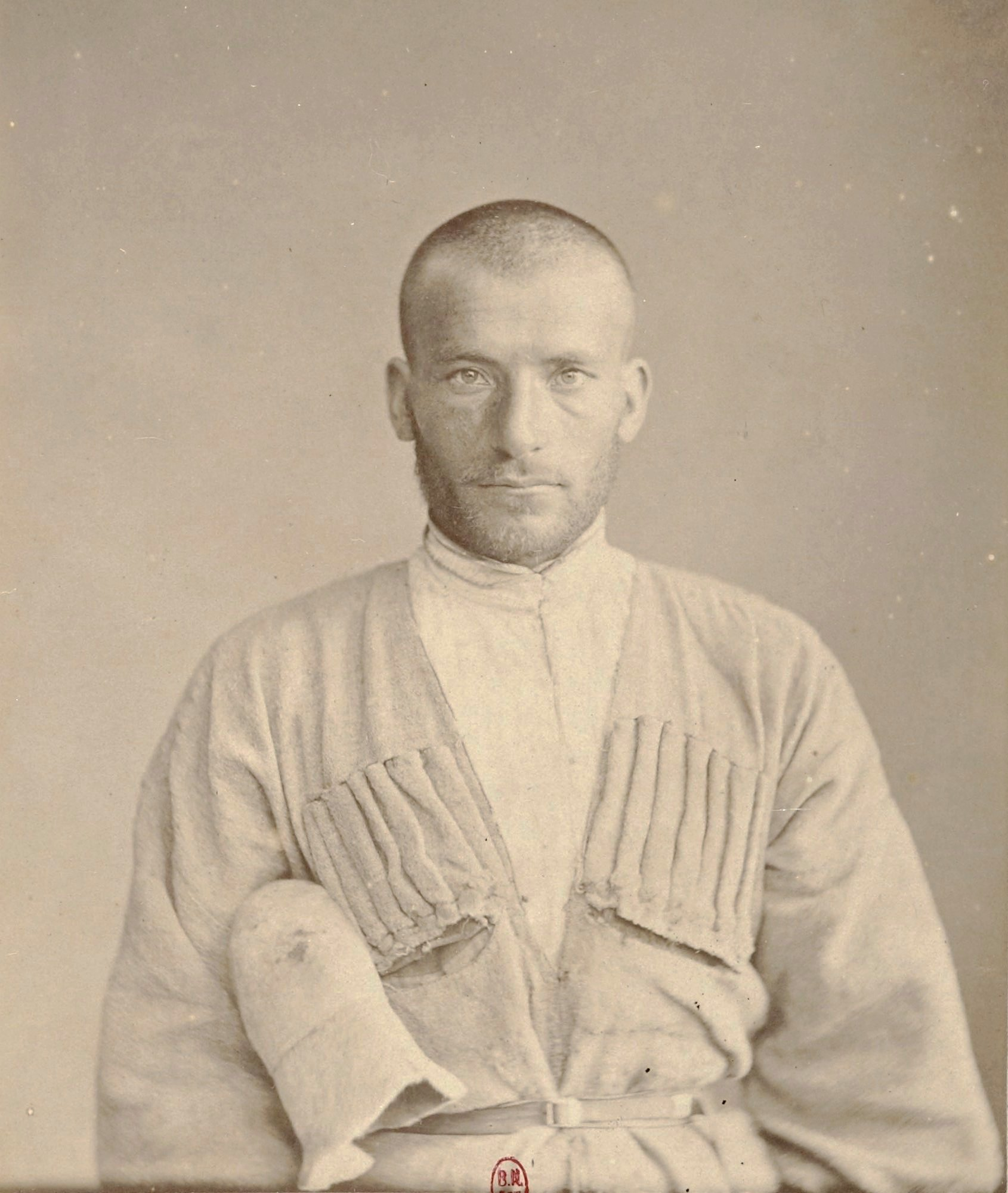
Ossetian man in 1881

== See also ==
- Alans
- Asud
- Digor (people)
- Iazyges
- Iron (people)
- Jassic people
- Alexander Kubalov
- Ossetians in Trialeti
- Ossetians in Turkey
- Peoples of the Caucasus
- List of Ossetians
- Sarmatians
- Scythians
- Terek Cossacks

== Bibliography ==
- Beletsky, D.; Vinogradov, A. (2011). Nizhniy Arkhyz i Senty - drevneyshiye khramy Rossii. Problemy khristianskogo iskusstva Alanii i Severo-Zapadnogo Kavkaza (in Russian). Mockba.
- Foltz, Richard (2022). The Ossetes: Modern-Day Scythians of the Caucasus. London: Bloomsbury. ISBN 9780755618453.
- Hamed-Troyansky, Vladimir (2024). Empire of Refugees: North Caucasian Muslims and the Late Ottoman State. Stanford, CA: Stanford University Press. ISBN 978-1-5036-3696-5.
- Nasidze; et al. (May 2004). "Mitochondrial DNA and Y-Chromosome Variation in the Caucasus". Annals of Human Genetics. 68 (3): 205–21. doi:10.1046/j.1529-8817.2004.00092.x. PMID 15180701. S2CID 27204150.
- Nasidze; et al. (2004). "Genetic Evidence Concerning the Origins of South and North Ossetians" (PDF). Annals of Human Genetics. 68 (Pt 6): 588–99. doi:10.1046/j.1529-8817.2004.00131.x. PMID 15598217. S2CID 1717933. Archived from the original (PDF) on 12 January 2012.
