= Ossetian Muslims =

Iron Ossetic: Ирон пысылмӕттӕ

Total population
- 200,000

Regions with significant populations
- Turkey: 20,000–50,000
- Russia: 55,026
- North Ossetia–Alania: 43,000
- Kabardino-Balkaria: 6877
- Stavropol Krai: 1146
- Syria: 700

Languages
- Ossetian

Religion
- Islam (Sunni Hanafi)

Related ethnic groups
- Ossetians

Ossetian Muslims (Iron Ossetic: Ирон пысылмӕттӕ, romanized: Iron pysylmættæ) are ethnic Ossetians who practice Islam and are native to the region of Ossetia in the North Caucasus. While the majority of Ossetians are Christian (predominantly Eastern Orthodox) and professing their ancestral faith Uatsdin, according to official estimates, 30 percent of the population of North Ossetia–Alania is Muslim (predominantly Sunni).

The majority of Ossetian Muslims today reside in Turkey, as well as the Western areas of North Ossetia, such as the Irafsky, Kirovsky, and Pravoberezhny Districts and in Vladikavkaz, with minorities in the Alagirsky, Ardonsky, Mozdoksky, as well as in Syria, Kabardino-Balkaria, and Stavropol Krai. The Ossetian Muslim community is made up of people from both the Digor, and Iron subgroups of Ossetians.

== History ==
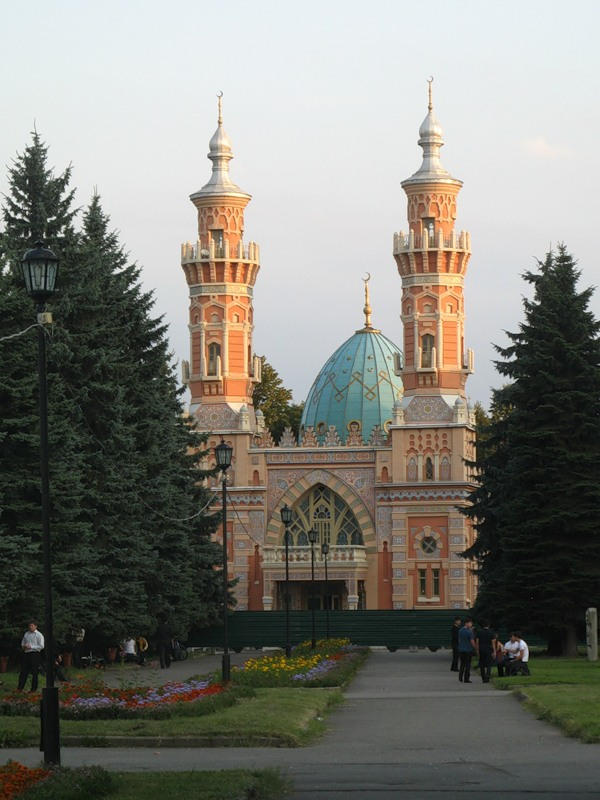
The Mukhtarov Mosque in Vladikavkaz

=== In Digoria ===
Islam was first introduced amongst Ossetians in the 17th century when the local Digor Ossetians converted to Islam under the influence of the neighbouring Kabardin people who professed Islam. Prior to the accession of Digoria to the Russian Empire in 1827, the vast majority of Digorians professed Islam. Previously in 1750. representatives of the Digor families of the Abisalovs, Bituevs and Mistulovs adopted Christianity following the example of the Kabardian princes who professed Christianity. However, by the 1830-40s most of the Digorians had re-accepted Islam. Numerous Muslim communities appeared in the settlements of Makhchesk, Stur-Digora, Aksau, Fasnal.

It is estimated that up to 50,000 Ossetians left the Caucasus in the early 1860s as part of a larger migration of Muslims from the region to the Ottoman Empire.

=== Islam in the rest of Ossetia ===
Back in the 16th century, Islam penetrated the Tagaurian society. In the 17th century, all eleven Tagaur feudal surnames converted to Islam. Soon, ordinary people began to accept Islam. In 1785, Akhmed Dudarov, the Tagaurian Uazdan-Aldar, the owner of the village of Chmi, contributed to the adoption of Islam by the Chmins, and actively spread Islam throughout the territory, building a stone mosque in the village of Saniba .

In 1825–30, the rebel movement in Tagauria and Kurtatia was led by Beslan Shanaev, Khazbi Tulatov, Dzanhot Mamsurov, Kurgok Karsanov and others. Units of the tsarist general Abkhazov burned Chmi, Kani, Lamardon and other villages. Settlers from Chmi founded the village of Kardzhin, settlers from Kani founded Brut. Tagaurian settlers also participated in the founding of the village of Elxot, Zilgæ, Skhwyd Khox, etc. In 1840, according to Kaloev, there were 3 mosques in mountainous Tagauria: one in Saniba, one in Cymi and one more either in Koban or in Kani.

=== Issues ===
Anti-Muslim sentiment among non-Muslim Ossetians have grown due to incidents of regional Islamic extremism, negative perceptions of the Ingush who are increasingly equated with Ossetian Muslims, and the belief that Ossetian society is Christian and "civilized". This has led to local authorities surveilling local mosques and religious Muslims under the pretext of rooting out Jihadism. Negative perception of Islam in Ossetia has also led to several Muslim Ossetians converting to Christianity or downplaying their religious identity.

A short-lived militant Jihadist organization connected to the North Caucasus insurgency called Kataib al-Khoul (2006-2009) was formed in North Ossetia and gained infamy attacking casinos in Vladikavkaz, orchestrating assassinations of high-ranking state and military officials and other prominent targets, including the Ossetian Muslim poet Shamil Jikayev. According to political scientist Emil Aslan, these incidents of Islamic extremism were rare, engaged in by a relative few people and had no popular support which indicated that the region was otherwise devoid of local Islamic extremism. But these incidents provoked backlash and discrimination from local authorities and negative attitudes towards Muslims in general.

== See also ==
- Islam in Russia
