= Ossetians in Georgia =

Map showing Ossetian settlements in Georgia.

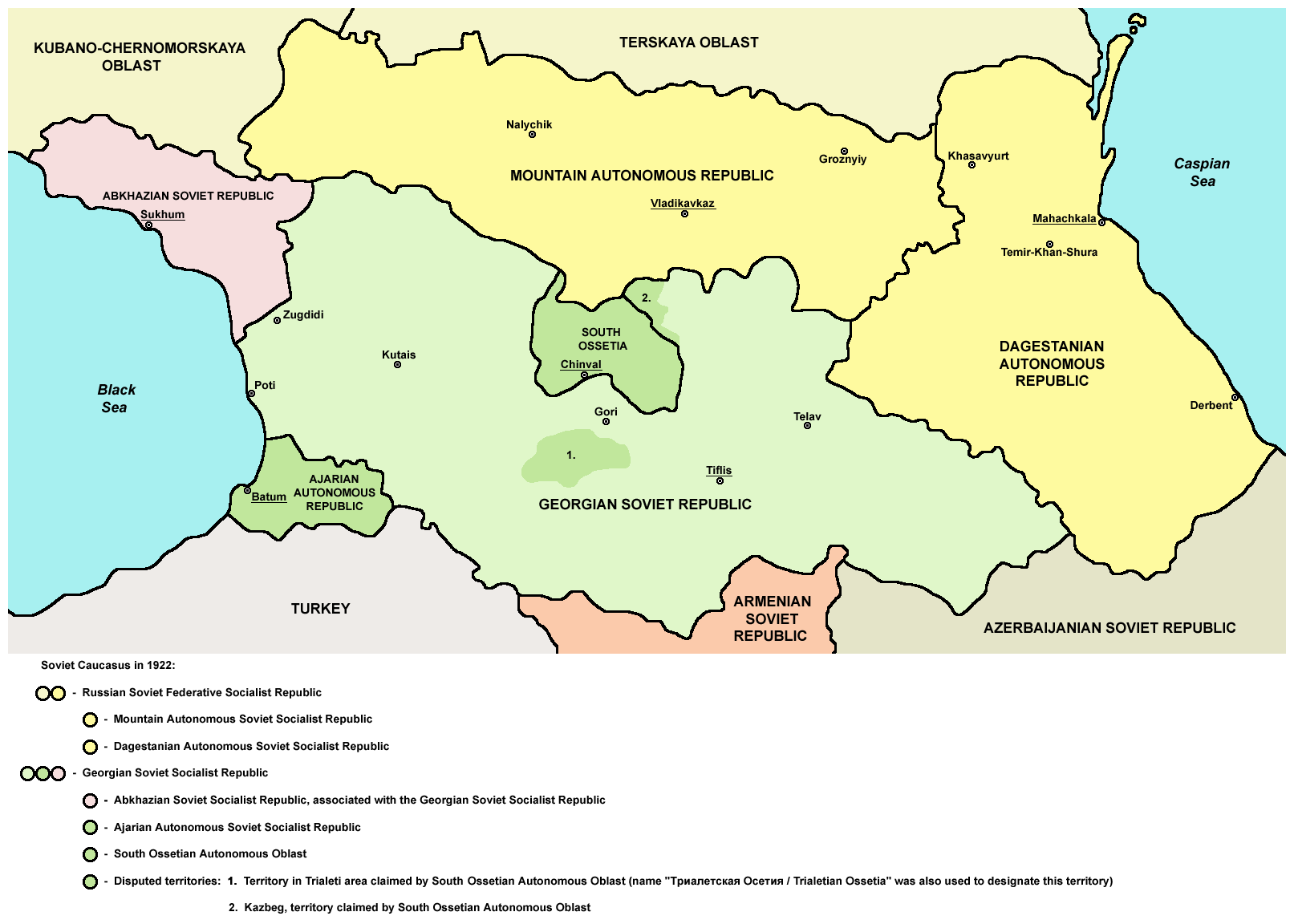
Map of Georgia in 1922 with Ossetian ethnic groups shown

The Ossetians in Georgia are a group of ethnic Ossetians, settled mainly the central Georgia, the region of Shida Kartli and the district of Borjomi.

== History ==
Ossetian migration to the Georgian regions began in the 13th and 14th centuries and is believed to be connected to the fall of Kingdom of Alania in the North Caucasus to the Mongols and later to Timur's armies. They retreated into the mountains of the central Caucasus and gradually started moving south, across the Caucasus Mountains into the Kingdom of Georgia. (Note: Coene, page 151) In the 17th century, under pressure from the Kabardian princes, Ossetians started a second wave of migration from the North Caucasus to the Kingdom of Kartli.

From the 15 to the 18 centuries, Ossetians living in the South Caucasus actively participated in the wars for independence of the Kingdom of Kartli against the Ottoman and Persian conquerors. In 1770, ossetians took part in the Battle of Aspindza on the side of Erekle II. One of the leaders of the Georgian army was an ethnic Ossetian, Bolatiko Khetagurov.

In the second half of the 17th century, the Duchy of Ksani already had a mixed Ossetian-Georgian population.

Following the breakdown of the Tsarist regime in Russia, Ossetians, fighting a war against the newly independent Menshevik Georgia. Initially Georgia was successful, but in 1921, the Soviet invaded (supported by the Ossetians) and conquered the country (including South Ossetia).. In 1922 South Ossetian Autonomous Oblast was established within the Georgian Soviet Socialist Republic (SOAO) by the Soviet administration under pressure from Kavburo (the Caucasian Bureau of the Central Committee of the Russian Communist Party). It is believed that the SAOA was established by central Soviet government in exchange for Ossetian loyalty and support of Russian Bolsheviks in their fight against Georgian Mensheviks. This area had never been a separate entity prior to the Russian invasion. (Note: De Waal et al, Beyond Frozen Conflict, chapter 6. South Ossetia Today) The drawing of administrative boundaries of the South Ossetian AO was quite a complicated process. Many Georgian villages were included within the South Ossetian AO despite numerous protests by the Georgian population. While the city of Tskhinvali did not have a majority Ossetian population, it was made the capital of the South Ossetian AO. In 1922, the recently created South Ossetian Autonomous Oblast claimed the villages, mainly settled by Ossetians in Trialeti as its exclave - to no avail, however.
