= Iranian languages =

Branch of the Indo-Iranian languages in the Indo-European language family

Iranian
- Iranic
- Geographic distribution: West Asia, Eastern Europe, Caucasus, Central Asia, and South Asia
- Ethnicity: Iranian peoples
- Native speakers: est. 200 million
- Linguistic classification: Indo-European: Indo-Iranian; Iranian
- Proto-language: Proto-Iranian
- Subdivisions: Western; Avestan †; Eastern

Language codes
- ISO 639-2 / 5: ira
- Glottolog: iran1269
- Linguasphere: 58=
- Distribution of the Iranian languages in and around the Iranian plateau

The Iranian languages, or Iranic languages, are a branch of the Indo-Iranian languages in the Indo-European language family that are spoken natively by the Iranian peoples, mainly in the Iranian Plateau.

The Iranian languages are grouped in three stages: Old Iranian (until 400 BCE), Middle Iranian (400 BCE – 900 CE) and New Iranian (since 900 CE). The two directly attested Old Iranian languages are Old Persian (from the Achaemenid Empire) and Avestan (the language of the Avesta). Of the Middle Iranian languages, the better understood and recorded ones are Middle Persian (from the Sasanian Empire), Parthian (from the Parthian Empire), and Bactrian (from the Kushan and Hephthalite empires).

== Number of speakers ==
In 2005, Ethnologue estimated that there are 86 languages in the group.

Top languages by number of native speakers
Name	speakers
Persian	92 million
Pashto	38 million
Kurdish	28 million
Balochi	5–8 million
Caspian	10 million
Luri	5 million
150–200 million

== Terminology and grouping ==
=== Etymology ===
The term Iran derives directly from Middle Persian Ērān, first attested in a third-century inscription at Naqsh-e Rostam, with the accompanying Parthian inscription using the term Aryān, in reference to the Iranian peoples. The Middle-Iranian ērān and aryān are oblique plural forms of gentilic nouns ēr- (Middle Persian) and ary- (Parthian), both deriving from Proto-Iranian language *arya- (meaning "Aryan", i.e. "of the Iranians"). In the Iranic languages spoken on the plateau, the gentilic is attested as a self-identifier, included in ancient inscriptions and the literature of the Avesta, (Note: In the Avesta, the airiia- are members of the ethnic group of the Avesta-reciters themselves, in contradistinction to the anairiia- (the "non-Arya"). The word also appears four times in Old Persian: One is in the Behistun Inscription, where ariya- is the name of a language (DB 4.89). The other three instances occur in Darius the Great's inscription at Naqsh-e Rostam (DNa 14–15), in Darius I's inscription at Susa (DSe 13–14), and in the inscription of Xerxes I at Persepolis (XPh 12–13). In these, the two Achaemenid dynasties describe themselves as pārsa pārsahyā puça ariya ariyaciça "a Persian, son of a Persian, an Ariya, of Ariya origin."—The phrase with ciça ("origin, descendance") assures that ariya is an ethnic name wider in meaning than pārsa and not a simple adjectival epithet.) and remains also in other Iranian ethnic names Alan (Iron Ossetic: Ир Ir) and Iron (Ирон).

=== Iranian vs. Iranic ===
When used as a linguistic term Iranian is applied to any language which descends from the ancestral Proto-Iranian language.

Some scholars such as John R. Perry prefer the term Iranic as the anthropological name for the linguistic family and ethnic groups of this category, and Iranian for anything about the modern country of Iran. He uses the same analogue as in differentiating German from Germanic, Finnish from Finnic, or differentiating Turkish and Turkic.

This use of the term for the Iranian language family was introduced in 1836 by Christian Lassen. Robert Needham Cust used the term Irano-Aryan in 1878, and Orientalists such as George Abraham Grierson and Max Müller contrasted Irano-Aryan (Iranian) and Indo-Aryan (Indic (Note: In modern and colloquial context, the term "Indic" refers more generally to the languages of the Indian subcontinent, thus also including non-Aryan language families like Dravidian and Munda. See e.g. Reynolds, Mike; Verma, Mahendra (2007). "Indic languages". In Britain, David (ed.). Language in the British Isles. Cambridge: Cambridge University Press. pp. 293–307. ISBN 978-0-521-79488-6.)). Some recent scholarship, primarily in German, has revived this convention.

=== Grouping ===
The Iranian languages are divided into the following branches:

- The Western Iranian languages, subdivided into:
  - Southwestern, of which Persian (including the Dari, Tajik, and Hazaragi dialects) and Luri are the dominant members;
  - Northwestern, of which the Kurdish languages are the dominant members.
- The Eastern Iranian languages, subdivided into:
  - Southeastern, of which Pashto is the dominant member;
  - Northeastern, by far the smallest branch, of which Ossetian is the dominant member.

According to modern scholarship, the Avestan languages are not considered to fall under these categories, and are instead sometimes classified as Central Iranian, since they diverged from Proto-Iranian before the east–west division rose to prominence. It has traditionally been viewed as Eastern Iranian; however, it lacks a large number of Eastern Iranian features and thus is only "Eastern Iranian" in the sense that it is not Western.

== Proto-Iranian ==
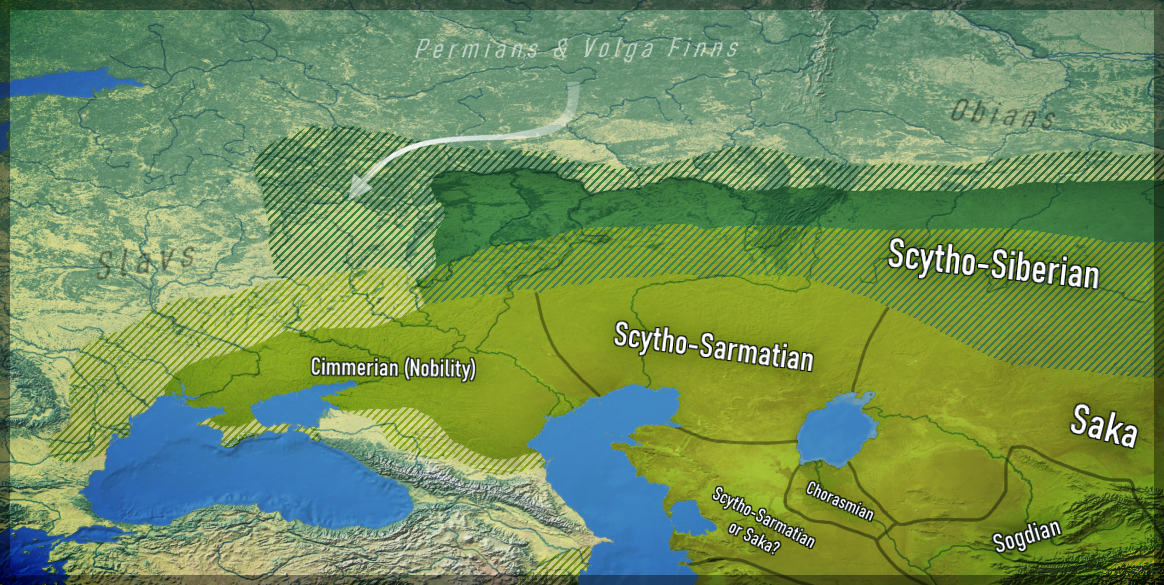
Distribution of Iranic peoples in Central Asia during the Iron Age period.

The Iranian languages all descend from a common ancestor: Proto-Iranian, which itself evolved from Proto-Indo-Iranian. This ancestor language is speculated to have origins in Central Asia, and the Andronovo culture of the Bronze Age is suggested as a candidate for the common Indo-Iranian culture around 2000 BCE.

The language was situated precisely in the western part of Central Asia that borders present-day Russia and Kazakhstan. It was thus in relative proximity to the other satem ethno-linguistic groups of the Indo-European family, such as Thracian, Balto-Slavic and others, and to common Indo-European's original homeland (more precisely, the Pontic-Caspian Steppe to the north of the Black Sea and the Caucasus), according to the reconstructed linguistic relationships of common Indo-European.

Proto-Iranian thus dates to some time after the Proto-Indo-Iranian breakup, or the early-2nd millennium BCE, as the Old Iranian languages began to break off and evolve separately as the various Iranian tribes migrated and settled in vast areas of southeastern Europe, the Iranian Plateau, and Central Asia.

Proto-Iranian innovations compared to Proto-Indo-Iranian include: the turning of sibilant fricative *s into non-sibilant fricative glottal *h; the voiced aspirated plosives *bʰ, *dʰ, *gʰ yielding to the voiced unaspirated plosives *b, *d, *g resp.; the voiceless unaspirated stops *p, *t, *k before another consonant changing into fricatives *f, *θ, *x resp.; voiceless aspirated stops *pʰ, *tʰ, *kʰ turning into fricatives *f, *θ, *x, resp.

== Old Iranian ==
The multitude of Middle Iranian languages and peoples indicate that great linguistic diversity must have existed among the ancient speakers of Iranian languages. Of that variety of languages/dialects, direct evidence of only two has survived. These are:

- Avestan, the two languages/dialects of the Avesta (the liturgical texts of Zoroastrianism).
- Old Persian, the native language of a southwestern Iranian people known as Persians.

Indirectly attested Old Iranian languages are discussed below.

Old Persian was an Old Iranian dialect as it was spoken in southwestern Iran (the modern-day province of Fars) by the inhabitants of Parsa, Persia, or Persis who also gave their name to their region and language. Genuine Old Persian is best attested in one of the three languages of the Behistun inscription, composed c. 520 BCE, and which is the last inscription (and only inscription of significant length) in which Old Persian is still grammatically correct. Later inscriptions are comparatively brief, and typically simply copies of words and phrases from earlier ones, often with grammatical errors, which suggests that by the 4th century BCE the transition from Old Persian to Middle Persian was already far advanced, but efforts were still being made to retain an "old" quality for official proclamations.

The other directly attested Old Iranian dialects are the two forms of Avestan, which take their name from their use in the Avesta, the liturgical texts of indigenous Iranian religion that now goes by the name of Zoroastrianism but in the Avesta itself is simply known as vohu daena (later: behdin). The language of the Avesta is subdivided into two dialects, conventionally known as "Old (or 'Gathic') Avestan", and "Younger Avestan". These terms, which date to the 19th century, are slightly misleading since 'Younger Avestan' is not only much younger than 'Old Avestan', but also from a different geographic region. The Old Avestan dialect is very archaic, and at roughly the same stage of development as Rigvedic Sanskrit. On the other hand, Younger Avestan is at about the same linguistic stage as Old Persian, but by virtue of its use as a sacred language retained its "old" characteristics long after the Old Iranian languages had yielded to their Middle Iranian stage. Unlike Old Persian, which has Middle Persian as its known successor, Avestan has no clearly identifiable Middle Iranian stage (the effect of Middle Iranian is indistinguishable from effects due to other causes).

In addition to Old Persian and Avestan, which are the only directly attested Old Iranian languages, all Middle Iranian languages must have had a predecessor "Old Iranian" form of that language, and thus can all be said to have had an (at least hypothetical) "Old" form. Such hypothetical Old Iranian languages include Old Parthian. Additionally, the existence of unattested languages can sometimes be inferred from the impact they had on neighbouring languages. Such transfer is known to have occurred for Old Persian, which has (what is called) a "Median" substrate in some of its vocabulary. Also, foreign references to languages can also provide a hint to the existence of otherwise unattested languages, for example through toponyms/ethnonyms or in the recording of vocabulary, as Herodotus did for what he called "Scythian" and in one instance, Median (σπάκα "dog").

=== Isoglosses ===
Conventionally, Iranian languages are grouped into "western" and "eastern" branches. These terms have little meaning with respect to Old Avestan as that stage of the language may predate the settling of the Iranian peoples into western and eastern groups. The geographic terms also have little meaning when applied to Younger Avestan since it is not known where that dialect (or dialects) was spoken either. Certain is only that Avestan (all forms) and Old Persian are distinct, and since Old Persian is "western", and Avestan was not Old Persian, Avestan acquired a default assignment to "eastern". Further confusing the issue is the introduction of a western Iranian substrate in later Avestan compositions and redactions undertaken at the centers of imperial power in western Iran (either in the south-west in Persia, or in the north-west in Nisa/Parthia and Ecbatana/Media).

Two of the earliest dialectal divisions among Iranian indeed happen to not follow the later division into Western and Eastern blocks. These concern the fate of the Proto-Indo-Iranian first-series palatal consonants, *ć and *dź:

- Avestan and most other Iranian languages have deaffricated and depalatalized these consonants, and have *ć > s, *dź > z.
- Old Persian, however, has fronted these consonants further: *ć > θ, *dź > *ð > d.

As a common intermediate stage, it is possible to reconstruct depalatalized affricates: *c, *dz. (This coincides with the state of affairs in the neighboring Nuristani languages.) A further complication however concerns the consonant clusters *ćw and *dźw:

- Avestan and most other Iranian languages have shifted these clusters to sp, zb.
- In Old Persian, these clusters yield s, z, with loss of the glide *w, but without further fronting.
- The Saka language, attested in the Middle Iranian period, and its modern relative Wakhi fail to fit into either group: in these, palatalization remains, and similar glide loss as in Old Persian occurs: *ćw > š, *dźw > ž.

A division of Iranian languages in at least three groups during the Old Iranian period is thus implied:

- Persid (Old Persian and its descendants)
- Sakan (Saka, Wakhi, and their Old Iranian ancestor)
- Central Iranian (all other Iranian languages)

It is possible that other distinct dialect groups were already in existence during this period. Good candidates are the hypothetical ancestor languages of Alanian/Scytho-Sarmatian subgroup of Scythian in the far northwest; and the hypothetical "Old Parthian" (the Old Iranian ancestor of Parthian) in the near northwest, where original *dw > *b (paralleling the development of *ćw).

== Middle Iranian ==
What is known in Iranian linguistic history as the "Middle Iranian" era is thought to begin around the 4th century BCE lasting through the 9th century. Linguistically the Middle Iranian languages are conventionally classified into two main groups, Western and Eastern.

The Western family includes Parthian (Arsacid Pahlavi) and Middle Persian, while Bactrian, Sogdian, Khwarezmian, Saka, and Old Ossetic (Scytho-Sarmatian) fall under the Eastern category. The two languages of the Western group were linguistically very close to each other, but quite distinct from their eastern counterparts. On the other hand, the Eastern group was an areal entity whose languages retained some similarity to Avestan. They were inscribed in various Aramaic-derived alphabets which had ultimately evolved from the Achaemenid Imperial Aramaic script, though Bactrian was written using an adapted Greek script.

Middle Persian (Pahlavi) was the official language under the Sasanian dynasty in Iran. It was in use from the 3rd century CE until the beginning of the 10th century. The script used for Middle Persian in this era underwent significant maturity. Middle Persian, Parthian, and Sogdian were also used as literary languages by the Manichaeans, whose texts also survive in various non-Iranian languages, from Latin to Chinese. Manichaean texts were written in a script closely akin to the Syriac script. The Achomi (Larestani/Khodmooni) language is considered a surviving remains of Pahlavi Middle Persian, as well as Luri, with their respective dialects.

== New Iranian ==
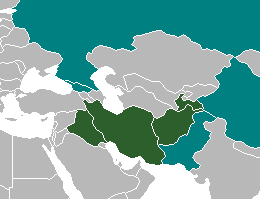
Dark green: countries where Iranian languages are official. Teal: countries where Iranian languages are official in a subdivision.

Following the Muslim conquest of Persia, there were essential changes in the role of the different dialects. The old prestige form of Middle Iranian, Pahlavi, which was associated with the western Sasanian provinces of Spahan and Pars, was replaced by a new variety as the official language of the court. In 875, the Saffarid dynasty was the first in a line of many dynasties to adopt the new prestige language officially.

West Iranian varieties from eastern regions may have had a significant impact on the development of the new standard, which served as the basis for a standardised New Persian. Medieval Iranian scholars such as ibn al-Muqaffa' (8th century) and ibn al-Nadim (10th century) associated the term Dari with the eastern province of Khorasan, Pahlavi for the dialects of the northwestern areas between the province of Isfahan and Azerbaijan, and Pârsi to describe the dialects of Fars (Persia).

These scholars also noted that the unofficial language of the royalty was Khuzi, associated with the western province of Khuzestan; it was likely a late variety of the Elamite language, a language isolate that previously was the official court language of Elam in that region.

The Islamic conquest also brought with it the adoption of the Arabic script for writing Persian and much later, Kurdish, Pashto and Balochi. All three were adapted to the writing by the addition of a few letters. This development probably occurred sometime during the second half of the 8th century, when the old middle Persian script began dwindling in usage. The Arabic script remains in use in contemporary modern Persian. The Tajik alphabet, used to write the Tajik language, was initially Romanized in the 1920s under the Soviet nationalities policy. This was shifted to a Cyrillic script in the 1930s.

The geographical regions in which Iranian languages were spoken were pushed back in several areas by newly neighbouring languages. Arabic spread into some parts of Western Iran, and Turkic languages spread through much of Central Asia, displacing various Eastern Iranian languages such as Sogdian and Bactrian in what is today Turkmenistan, Uzbekistan, and Tajikistan. In Eastern Europe, in what is now Ukraine, southern European Russia, and parts of the Balkans, the core region of the Eastern Iranian-speaking Scythians, Sarmatians, and Alans, had been decisively Slavicised by the various Early Slavs of the region by the 6th century. This resulted in the displacement and extinction of the once predominant Scythian languages of the region. Sogdian's close relative, Yaghnobi, barely survives in a small area of the Zarafshan Range east of Samarkand, Wakhi is spoken by nomadic pastoralists from Afghanistan to China, and Saka survives as Ossetic in Ciscaucasia, which is the sole remnant of the once-predominant Scythian languages of the region. Minority Eastern Iranian languages survive in the Pamir Mountains; Pashto is the only widely-spoken Eastern Iranian language, with at least 90 million speakers.

== Comparison table ==
English	Zaza	Persian	Lari	Tati	Talysh	Gilaki	Mazanderani	Sorani	Kurmanji	Pashto	Balochi	Tat (Caucaus)	Luri	Shughni	Middle Persian	Parthian	Old Persian	Avestan	Ossetian
beautiful	rind, xasek	zibā/xuš-čehr(e)/xoşgel	xäš, ǰuu	xojir	ghašang	xujīrçī/xujīr	xoşgel, xojir, xejir	ciwan, nayab	rind, delal, bedew, xweşik	x̌kūlay, x̌āista	dorr, soherâ, mah rang, sharr, juwān	qəşəng, şihid	qəşaŋ, xoşgel	xushrui, xagh(fem.) xigh(masc.)	hučihr, hužihr	hužihr	naiba	x^{v}a^{i}ni, sraiia, sr^{a}o-	ræsughd
blood	gonî	xūn	xün	xevn	xun	xun	xun	xwên	xwîn, xûn	wīna	hon	xun	xī(n)	xun	xōn	gōxan		vohuna, va^{ŋ}hutāt̰	tug
bread	nan, non	nān	nu	nun	nun	nön	nun	nan	nan	ḍoḍəi, məṛəi, naɣan/nɣaen	nān, nagan	nun	nu(n)	gartha	nān	nān		tāiiū^{i}r^{i}, dr^{a}o-naŋh (scared bread)	dzul
bring	ardene	āwurdan, biyār ("(you) bring!")	aordä	vârden, biyordon	varde	hävərdən, härdən, ävərdən, bərdən	biyârden	hanîn, hawerdin, hênan	anîn	(rā)wṛəl	âurten, yārag, ārag	avardən	o(v)erden,	videu	āwurdan, āwāy-, āwar-, bar-	āwāy-, āwar-, bar-	bara-	bara, bar-	xæssyn
brother	bira	barādar	berāsü, kaka	bərâr	bira, boli	bərär, bərâr	berâr, beror	bira	bira	wror	brāt, brās	birar	Gaghe	værod	brād, brâdar	brād, brādar	brātar	brātar-	æfsymær
(to) come	ameyene	āmadan	ondä	biyâmiyan	ome	həmän, ämön, hömän	biyamona, enen, biyâmuen	hatin, were, bew (Pehlewanî)	hatin, wer-	rā tləl	āhag, āyag, hatin	amarən	umae(n)	yà	āmadan, awar	awar, čām	āy-, āgam	āgam-	cæwyn
to cry	bermayene	gerīstan/gerīye	gerīɣ	bərma	berame, bame	burmə	berme	giryan, girîn, gîristin (Pehlewanî)	girîn	žəṛəl	greewag, grehten	girəstən	gerevesen, gereva	náu	griy-, bram-	barmâdan		snuδ,	kæwyn
dark	tarî	tārīk, tār	tārīk, zolomat	ul, gur, târica, târek	toki	zuləmât, tärik	tār, siyo, zolamât	tarî/tarîk	tarî	skəṇ, skaṇ, tyara	tār	tariki	tārīk	torice	tārīg/k	tārīg, tārēn	tārīk	sāmahe, sāma	tar
daughter	keyne, çêne/çêneke	doxtar	dot	titiye, dətar	kinə, kila	lâku, kör (girl) dətər (daughter)	kîjâ(girl), deter (daughter)	kîj, kiç, kenîşk, düêt (Pehlewanî), dwêt (Pehlewanî)	dot, keç	lūr	dohtir, duttag	duxtər	doxter	rezin	duxtar	duxt, duxtar		duxδar	čyzg (Iron), kizgæ (Digor)
day	roce, roje, roze	rūz	roz, rüz	revj, ruz	ruj	ruz, ruj	ruz, ruj	řoj, rûj (Pehlewanî)	roj	wrəd͡z (rwəd͡z)	roç	ruz	ru	ruz	rōz		raucah-	raocah-	bon
to do	kerdene	kardan	kerdä	kardan, kordan	karde	gudən, kudən, kördən	hâkerden, hâkorden	kirdin	kirin	kawəl	kanag, kurtin	saxtən	kerde	chideu	kardan	kartan	kạrta-	kәrәta-	kænyn
door	ber, keyber, çêber	dar	där	darvâca	bə	bər	dar, loş	derge/derke, derga, qapî (Kelhorî)	derî	wər, dərwāza	dar, gelo, darwāzag	dər	dər, dar	dêve	dar	dar, bar	duvara-	dvara-	dwar
to die	merdene	mordan	mordä	bamarden	marde	murdən, mərdən	bamerden	mirdin	mirin	mrəl	mireg, murten	mürdən	morde	mideu	murdan		mạriya-	mar-	mælyn
donkey	her	xar	xär	astar, xar	hə, hər	xər	xar	ker, gwêdirêj, xer (Pehlewanî)	ker	xər	har, her, kar	xər	xər	marcabe	xar			kaθβa	xæræg
to eat	werdene	xordan / xurāk	xärdä	harden	harde	xördən, xöndən	xerâk / baxârden	xwardin	xwarin	xwāṛə, xurāk / xwaṛəl	warag, warâk, wārten	xardən	harde	xideu	parwarz / xwâr, xwardīg	parwarz / xwâr		hareθra / CE-, at-	xærinag
egg	hak, akk	toxm, xāya ("testicle")	toxm, xag	merqâna, karxâ	morqana, uyə	murqönə, murqänə	merqâne, tîm, balî	hêk/hêlke, tum, xaye (Pehlewanî), xa (Kelhorî)	hêk	hagəi	heyg, heyk, ā morg	xaykərg	xā'a	tarmurx	toxmag, xâyag	taoxmag, xâyag		t^{a}oxma-	ajk
earth	erd	zamīn	zemi	zemin	zamin	zəmi, gəl, bunə	zamîn, bene	zemîn, zewî, ʿerz, erd	erd, zevî	d͡zməka (md͡zəka)	zemin, degār	xari	zemi	zimath	zamīg	zamīg	zam-	zãm, zam, zem	zæxx
evening	şan	begáh	šum, šäꞵ	nomâzyar, nomâšon	shav	şänsər	nemâşun	êware, îware (Pehlewanî)	êvar	māx̌ām (māš̥ām)	begáh	şangum	evāra	véga	ēvārag	êbêrag		ar^{ə}zaŋh	izær
eye	çım	čashm	čäš	coš	čaş,gelgan	çum	çəş, bəj	çaw/çaş	çav	stərga	cham, chem	çüm	tīya, çaş	çem	čašm	čašm	čaša-	čašman-	cæst
father	pî, pêr	pedar, bābā	boa, bäꞵä	piyar, piya, dada	piya, lala, po	pér	pîyer, pîyar, per	bawk, bab, babe, bawg (Pehlewanî)	bav, bab	plār	pet, pes	piyər	bua	tat	pidar	pid	pitar	pitar	fyd
fear	ters	tars, harās	ters	târs	tars	tərs	taşe-vaşe, tars	tirs	tirs	wēra (yara), bēra	turs, terseg	tərsi	ters	hoge	tars	tars	tạrsa-	tar^{e}s-	tas
fiancé	waştî	nāmzād	nomzād	numzâ	nomja	nömzət	numze	desgîran,xwşavest	dergistî	čənghol [masculine], čənghəla [feminine]	nāmzād	nükürdə		xîsmenz	–	–		para-dāta (affianced)	usag
fine	weş, hewl	xoš, xūb, beh	xäš, ǰuu, bē	xojir, xar	xoş	xujīr, xurum	xâr, xeş, xojir	xoş	xweş	x̌a (š̥a), səm	wash, hosh	xuş, xas, xub	xu	bashand	dārmag			srīra	xorz, dzæbæx
finger	engişte/gişte, bêçike	angošt	kelīk	anquš	anqiştə	ənguşt, əngüşt	angus	engust, pence,angus, pênce	tilî, pêçî	gwəta	changol, mordâneg, lenkutk	əngüşt	kelek	angiht	angust			aṇgušta	ængwyldz
fire	adir	ātaš, āzar	täš	taš	otaş	təş	taş	agir/awir, ahir,ayer	agir	wōr (ōr)	âch, atesh, âs	ataş	taş, gor	yoç	âdur, âtaxsh	ādur	âç-	ātre-/aēsma-	art
fish	mase	māhi	mäī	mâyi	moy	mäyi	mâhî	masî	masî	kab (māhay)	māhi, māhig	mahi	māhi	moie	māhig	māsyāg		masya	kæsag
to go	şîyayene	ro/şo	čedä	šiyen, bišiyan	şe	şön	burden, bašiyen	çûn, řoştin, řoyiştin, çün (Pehlewanî)	çûn	tləl	shoten	raftən	ro	sà, tideu	şow/row	ay-	ai-	ay-, fra-vaz	cæwyn
God	Homa/Huma/Oma	Xodā, Izad, Yazdān, Baq	xoda	Xədâ	Xıdo	Xuda	Xedâ	Yezdan, Xwedê, Xuda, Xodê, Xwa(y)	Xwedê, Xweda, Xudê	Xodāy (xʷəday)	Xoda, Hwdâ	Xuda	xodā	Xuthoi	Xudā/Yazdān		baga-	baya-	xwycaw
good	hewl, rind, weş	xub, nīkū, beh	xub, xäš, nīk	xâr, xojir	çok	xujīr, xurum	xâr, xeş, xojir	baş, çak, xas	baş, rind	x̌ə (š̥ə)	zabr, sharr, jowain	xub, xas	xu	bashand	xūb, nêkog, beh		vahu-	vohu, vaŋhu-	xorz
grass	vaş	sabzeh, giyāh	giya, säꞵzä, säꞵzi	vâš	alaf	vâş	vâş	giya/gya	giya, çêre	wāx̌ə (wāš̥ə)	rem, sabzag	güyo	sozi, çame	woh	giyâ	giya	viş	urvarā	kærdæg
great	gird/girs, pîl	bozorg	gäp, got	pilla	yol, yal, vaz, dıjd	pilâ, pillə, pille	gat, pilla	gewre,mezin	mezin, gir	lōy, stər	mastar, mazan,tuh	kələ	gap	wazmin	wuzurg, pīl, yal		vazraka-	mazaṇt̰, masita, stūi	styr
hand	dest	dast	däs:	bâl	dast	dəs, bâl	das, bāl	dest, des	dest	lās	dast	dəs	das	thust	dast	dast	dasta-	zasta-	k'ux / arm
head	ser	sar	serä, sär, källä	kalla	sə, sər	kəlle, sər	kalle, sar	ser	ser	sər	sar, sarag, saghar	sər	sar	cile, cale	sar		kalli	sairi	sær
heart	zerrî/zerre	del	del	dəl	dıl	dīl, dəl, qlf	del, zel, zil	dil/dił/dir(Erbil)/zil	dil	zṛə	dil, hatyr	dül	del	dile, zorth	dil	dil		zaraŋh, zarəδiia, aηhuš	zærdæ
horse	estor/ostor/astor	asb	asp	asb, astar	asp	əsb, əsp	asp, as	asp/hesp/esp, hês(t)ir	hesp	ās [male], aspa [female]	asp	əs	asb	vorge	asp, stōr	asp, stōr	aspa	aspa-	bæx
house	key/çê	xāne	xunä	kiya	ka	sərə, xöne	sere, kime, xene	mał, xanû, xanig, ghat	xanî, mal	kor	ges, dawâr, log	xunə	huna	chide	xânag			demāna-, nmāna-	xædzar
hungry	vêşan/veyşan	gorosne, goşne	gošnä	vašnâ, vešir, gesnâ	vahşian	vəşnä, viştâ	veşnâ, veşnâsâr	birsî, wirsî (Pehlewanî)	birçî, birsî (behdînî)	lwəǵa (lwəẓ̌a)	shudig, shud	gisnə	gosna	maghzönch	gursag, shuy	veşnâg		ṣ̌uδ	
language (also tongue)	ziwan, zon, zuan, zuon, juan, jüan	zabān	zäbu	zobun, zəvân	zivon	zəvön, zuvön, zuvän	zivun, zebun, tok	ziman, zuwan	ziman	žəba	zewān, zobān	zuhun	zevu	zive	zuwān	izβān	hazâna-	hizvā-, zafana (mouth)	ævzag
to laugh	huyayene	xande	xänä	xurəsen, xandastan	sıre	purxə, xənde/ xəndəsən	rîk, baxendesten, xanne	kenîn/pêkenîn, kenîn,xende,xene	kenîn	xandəl/xənda	hendag, xandag	xəndə	xana	shinteu	xande, xand		karta	Syaoθnāvareza-	xudyn
life	cuye, weşîye	zendegi, jan	zendägi	zindәgi	jimon	zīndəgī, zīvəş	zindegî, jan	jiyan, jîn	jiyan	žwənd	zendegih, zind	həyat	zeŋei	zindage, umre	zīndagīh, zīwišnīh	žīwahr, žīw-		gaēm, gaya-	card
man	mêrdek, camêrd/cüamêrd	mard	märd	mardak, miarda	merd	mərd, mərdönə	mardî	mêrd, pîyaw, cuwamêr	mêr, mêrik, zilam	səṛay, mēṛə	merd	mərd	piyā	chorice, mardina	mard	mard	martiya-	mašīm, mašya	adæjmag
moon	aşme, menge (for month)	mâh, mâng, mânk	mā	mâng	mang, owşum	mâng, məng	ma, munek, mong, rojâ	mang, heyv	meh, heyv	spuǵməi (spožməi)	máh	ma	māh	mêst	māh	māh	mâh-	måŋha-	mæj
mother	may, mar	mâdar	nänä	mâr, mâya, nana	moa, ma, ina	mâr, mär	mâr, nenâ	dayik, dayig	dayik, dê	mor	mât, mâs	may	dā(ya), dāle(ka)	nan	mâdar	dayek	mâtar	mātar-	mad
mouth	fek	dahân	käp, dän	duxun, dâ:ân	gəv	dəhən	dâhun, lâmîze, loşe	dem	dev	xula (xʷəla)	dap	duhun, luše	dam	gêve	dahân, rumb			zafan, zafarə, åŋhānō, åñh	dzyx
name	name	nâm	num, näm	num	nom	nöm	num	naw, nêw	nav	nūm	nâm	num	num	nöme	nâm		nâman	nãman	nom
night	şew	shab	šum, šäꞵ	šö, šav	şav	şö, şöv, şəb	şow, şu	şew	şev	špa	šap, shaw	şöü	şo	hab	shab		xšap-	xšap-, naxti	æxsæv
to open	akerdene	bâz-kardan, va-kardan	vāz kerdä	vâz-kardan	okarde	vlätən, väzän, vâ-gudən	vâ-hekârden	kirdinewe, wazkirdin (Kelhorî)	vekirin	prānistəl	pāch, pabozag	vakardən	vākerde(n)	ët chideu	abâz-kardan, višādag		būxtaka-	būxta-	gom kænyn
peace	haştî/aştî	âshti, ârâmeš, ârâmî, sâzish	āšti, arum	dinj	aşiş	əşt	âştî, esket	aştî, aramî	aştî, aramî	rōɣa, t͡sōkāləi	ârâm	salaməti, dinci	āş(t)i	salöm	âštih, râmīšn	râm, râmīšn	šiyâti-	rāma-	fidyddzinad
pig	xoz/xonz, xinzir	xūk	xük	xu, xuyi, xug	xug	xuk	xî	beraz,goraz	beraz	soḍər, xənd͡zir (Arabic), xug	khug, huk	xug	xuk	xug	xūk			hū, varāza (boar)	xwy
place	ca	jâh/gâh	ǰa, ǰagä	yâga	vira	jâ, jigâ, jigə	jâ, gâ, kolâ	cê(cêga), ga, şwên, şwîn (Pehlewanî)	cih, geh	d͡zāy	ja, jaygah, hend	cigə, cə	jā	joi	gâh	gâh	gâθu-	gātu-, gātav-	ran
to read	wendene	xândan	xändä	baxânden	hande, xwande	xöndən, xönəsən	baxenden, baxundesten	xwendin/xwêndin, xwenistin	xwendin	lwastəl, kōtəl	wánag, wānten	xundən	vane(n)	heideu	xwândan			pa^{i}t^{i}-pǝrǝs	kæsyn
to say	vatene	goftan, gap(-zadan)	gotä	vâten, baguten	vote	gutən, guftən	baowten, boten, bagoten	gutin, witin	gotin	wayəl	gushag, guashten	guftirən, gaf saxtən	gute(n)	lövdeu	guftan, gōw-, wâxtan	gōw-	gaub-	vac, mrū-	dzuryn
sister	waye	xâhar/xwâhar	xongü, dada	xâke, xâv, xâxor, xuâr	hova	xâxur, xâxər	xâxer, xâxor, xoar	xweh, xweşk, xoşk, xuşk, xoyşk	xwîşk, xwih, xwişk, xweh	xōr (xʷōr)	gwhâr	xuvar	xuar	yàx, yàxbìç	xwahar			x^{v}a^{ŋ}har-	xo
small	qic/qiyt, wird/werdî	kuchak, kam, xurd, rîz	käydü	qijel, ruk	hırd	kuçhī, kujī, kuştə	peçik, biçuk, xerd	giçke, qicik, hûr, biçûk, büçik (Kelhorî)	biçûk, piçûk, hûr, qicik	kūčnay, waṛ(ū)kay	gwand, hurd	küçük, küşkin, kişgələ, kəm	koçek	zulice	kam, rangas	kam	kamna-	kasu, kamna-	chysyl
son	lac, laj	pesar, pur	pos	pur, zâ	zoə, zurə	vəçə, rikə, pəsər, rəy	peser/rîkâ	law/kuř	kur, law, pis	zoy	possag, baç	kuk	kor	puç	pur, pusar	puhr	puça	pūθra-	fyrt
soul	roh, gan	ravân, jân	ǰu, rǖ	rəvân	con	ruh, jön	ro, jân	can, giyan, rewan, revan	reh, can	sā	rawân	can		jöne	rūwân, jyân	rūwân, jyân		urvan-	ud
spring	wesar/usar	bahâr	baar	vâ:âr	əvəsor, bahar	vəhâr, bâhâr	vehâr, behâr	behar, wehar	bihar, behar	spərlay	bārgāh	vasal	behār, vehār	bahor	wahâr		vâhara-	va^{ŋ}har	
tall	berz	boland / bârz	boländ	pilla	barz, bılınd	burz, bələnd	belen, belend	bilind/berz	bilind	lwəṛ, ǰəg	borz, bwrz	bülünd	beleŋ	beland	buland, borz	bârež		bərəzaṇt̰	bærzond
ten	des	dah	dǟ	da	da	dä	da, datâ	deh/de	deh	ləs	dah	də	da	thiste	dah		datha	dasa	dæs
three	hîrê/hîrî	se	se	so, se	se, he	su, sə	se, setâ	sê	sê	drē	sey	sə	se	arai	sê	hrē	çi-	θri-	ærtæ
village	dewe	deh, wis	dē	döh, da	di	mällə, məhällə, kəläyə	dih, male, kolâ, kande	gund, dêhat, dê, awayî	gund	kəlay	dehāt, helk, kallag, dê	di	de	qishloq	wiž	dahyu-	vîs-, dahyu-	vîs	qæw
want	waştene	xâstan	vessä	begovastan, jovastan	piye	xäsən, xästən	bexâsten, bexâsti	xwastin, wîstin, twastin (Pehlewanî)	xwestin	ɣ(ʷ)ux̌təl / ɣ(ʷ)uxš̥təl	loath, loteten	xastən, vayistən	hāse	forteu	xwâstan			ūna, a^{i}ništi	fændyn
water	awe/awk, owe, ou	âb	aꞵ	âv, ö	ov, wat(orandian dialect)	ow, âv	ow, ou, u	aw	av	obə/ubə	âp	ou	ow	haç	âb/aw	aw	âpi	avō-	don
when	key	key	käy	key	keyna	kén, kəy	ke, kemin, geder	key, kengî(Hewlêrî)	kengê, kîngê, kengî	kəla	kadi, ked	key, çüvəxti	ke	çavaxt	kay	ka		cim-	kæd
wind	va	bâd	bad	vâ	vo	vâ	vâ	ba, wa (Pehlewanî)	ba	siləi	gwáth	var	bād	huz	wâd	wa		vāta-	dymgæ / wad
wolf	verg	gorg	gorg	varg	varg	vərg	verg, verk	gurg,	gur	lewə, šarmux̌ (šarmuš̥)	gurk	gürg	gorg	urge/urj	gurg		varka-	vehrka	birægh
woman	cinî/cenî	zan	zenä, zän	zeyniye, zenak	jen, jiyan	zən, zənək, zunönə	zenā	jin, afret, zindage,gyian	jin, jinik, pîrek	jənəi, njləi (lit. Girl) x̌əd͡za/š̥əd͡za	jan, jinik	zən	zena	ghenice/ghinice, caxoi	zan	žan		gǝnā, γnā, ǰa^{i}ni-,	sylgojmag / us
year	serre	sâl	sal	sâl	sor, sal	sâl	sâl	sal/sał	sal	kāl	sâl	sal	sāl	sol	sâl		θard	ýāre, sar^{ә}d	az
yes / no	ya, heya, ê / nê, ney, nî	baleh, ârē, hā / na, née	o / nä	ahan / na	ha / ne, na	əhâ/nä, nâ	are, ehe / nâ, no	bełê, a, erê / ne, nexêr	erê, belê, a / na	Hao, ao, wō / na, ya	ere, hān / na	həri, hə / nə	a, ā / na	ön / nai, nå	ōhāy / ne	hâ / ney	yâ / nay, mâ	yā / noit, mā	o / næ
yesterday	vizêr	diruz	de	azira, zira, diru	zir, zinə	dîru	dîruz, aruz	dwênê, dwêke	duho	parun	zí	deydi	diru	biyor	dêrûž		diya(ka)	zyō	znon
English	Zaza	Persian	Lari	Tati	Talyshi	Gilaki	Mazandarani	Sorani	Kurmanji	Pashto	Balochi	Tat	Luri	Shughni	Middle Persian	Parthian	Old Persian	Avestan	Ossetian

== Bibliography ==
- Bailey, H. W. (1979). Dictionary of Khotan Saka. Cambridge University Press. 1979. 1st Paperback edition 2010. ISBN 978-0-521-14250-2.
- Schmitt, Rüdiger, ed. (1989). Compendium Linguarum Iranicarum (in German). Wiesbaden: Reichert. ISBN 978-3-88226-413-5.
- Sims-Williams, Nicholas (1996). "Iranian languages". Encyclopedia Iranica. Vol. 7. Costa Mesa: Mazda. pp. 238–245.
- Yarshater, Ehsan, ed. (1996). "Iran". Encyclopedia Iranica. Vol. 7. Costa Mesa: Mazda.
- Frye, Richard N. (1996). "Peoples of Iran". Encyclopedia Iranica. Vol. 7. Costa Mesa: Mazda.
- Windfuhr, Gernot L. (1995). "Cases in Iranian languages and dialects". Encyclopedia Iranica. Vol. 5. Costa Mesa: Mazda. pp. 25–37.
- Windfuhr, Gernot (2012). The Iranian languages. Routledge Taylor and Francis Group.
- Lazard, Gilbert (1996). "Dari". Encyclopedia Iranica. Vol. 7. Costa Mesa: Mazda.
- Henning, Walter B. (1954). "The Ancient language of Azarbaijan". Transactions of the Philological Society. 53 (1): 157–177. doi:10.1111/j.1467-968X.1954.tb00282.x.
- Rezakhani, Khodadad (2001). "The Iranian Language Family". Archived from the original on 2004-10-09.
- Skjærvø, Prods Oktor (2006). "Iran, vi. Iranian languages and scripts". Encyclopædia Iranica. Vol. 13.
- Delshad, Farshid (2010). Georgica et Irano-Semitica (PDF). Ars Poetica. Deutscher Wissenschaftsverlag DWV. ISBN 978-3-86888-004-5.
- Mallory, J. P.; Adams, Douglas Q. (2006). The Oxford introduction to Proto-Indo-European and the Proto-Indo-European world. Oxford University Press. ISBN 978-0-19-929668-2.
- Toroghdar, Zia (2018). "From Astara to Fuman: Comparison words from dialects of different languages Talysh and Tatic". Farhang-e Ilia. pp. 38–172.
