= Digor people =

Ossetian subgroup

Digors
Digorænttæ
- Ossetian flag

Total population
- ~200,000

Regions with significant populations
- Russia: est. 100,000: North Ossetia–Alania; Kabardino-Balkaria; Stavropol Krai
- Turkey: unknown

Languages
- West Ossetian

Religion
- Islam

Related ethnic groups
- Iron and Tual Ossetians, other Iranian peoples, Balkars

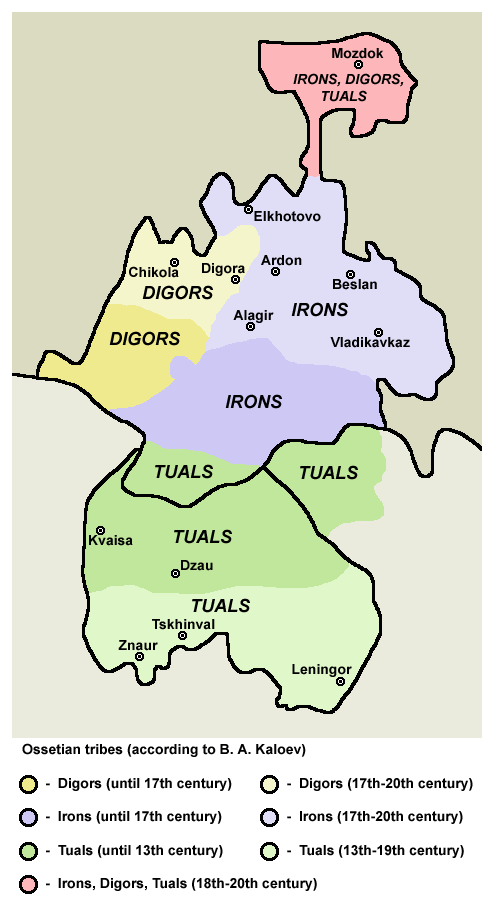
Ossetian tribes (according to B. A. Kaloev).

The Digor or West Ossetians (Iron Ossetic: Дигорæнттæ, romanized: Digorænttæ, pronounced [ˈdigo̞ɾʌ, ˈdigo̞ɾʌntːʌ]) are a subgroup of the Ossetians (Alans). They speak the Digor dialect of the Eastern Iranian Ossetian language, which in USSR, was considered a separate language until 1937. Since 1932, it has been considered just a dialect of Ossetian language. The speakers of the other dialect — Iron (East Ossetian) — do not understand Digor (West Ossetian), although the Digor usually understand East Ossetian, as it was the official language of the Ossetian people and was taught in schools. In the 2002 Russian Census 607 Digors were registered, but by the 2010 Russian Census, their number had dropped to only 223. It was estimated that there are 100,000 speakers of the dialect, most of whom identify as Ossetians. The Digor mainly live in Digorsky, Irafsky, Mozdoksky districts and Vladikavkaz, North Ossetia–Alania, also in Kabardino-Balkaria and Turkey (Poyrazlı, Boğazlıyan).

== Etymology ==
Scholars generally link the root dig- with the Circassian endonym A-dyg-e, where the suffix -or could be a mark of plurality as found in many contemporary Caucasian languages. This point of view was criticized by R. Bielmeier and D. Bekoev, they raised the ethnonym to "tygwyr" in the Iron dialect, meaning "gathering, gathering, group."

== History ==
=== Middle Ages ===
The early medieval Ashkharatsuyts makes mention of the "nation of the Ash-Tigor Alans" (azg Alanac' Aš-Tigor), or simply the "Dikor nation" (Dik'ori-n), which is generally regarded as an early reference to the Digor. This fact, and other linguistic considerations, have led scholars to believe that Digor dialect became separated from Proto-Ossetian during the Mongol conquests.

== Religion ==
Most Digors are Muslim. They were converted to Sunni Islam around the 17–18th centuries, under the influence of the neighboring Kabarday people who introduced Islam to them. Starting from the 18th century, the ethnonym digor became widely used by travelers and in Russian official documents. Digoria was annexed to the Russian Empire quite late compared to the rest of Ossetia. In the second half of the 19th century, large numbers of Muslim Digors emigrated to the Ottoman Empire.

== See also ==
- Ossetians
- Ossetian Muslims
- North Ossetia–Alania
- Digor (dialect)
- Jassic (dialect)

== Sources ==
- Wixman. The Peoples of the USSR, p. 58
