= Proto-Iranian language =

Reconstructed ancestor language of Persian, Avestan, Kurdish, Pashto and others

Proto-Iranian
- PIr, Proto-Iranic
- Reconstruction of: Iranian languages
- Era: 1900 BC - 1600 BC
- Reconstructed ancestors: Proto-Indo-European: Proto-Indo-Iranian

Proto-Iranian or Proto-Iranic is the reconstructed proto-language of the Iranian languages branch of Indo-European language family and thus the ancestor of the Iranian languages such as Persian, Pashto, Sogdian, Zazaki, Ossetian, Mazandarani, Kurdish, Talysh and others. Its speakers, the hypothetical Proto-Iranians, are assumed to have lived in the 2nd millennium BC and are usually connected with the Andronovo archaeological horizon (see Indo-Iranians).

Proto-Iranian was a satem language descended from the Proto-Indo-Iranian language, which in turn, came from the Proto-Indo-European language. It was likely removed less than a millennium from the Avestan language, and less than two millennia from Proto-Indo-European.

== Dialects ==
Skjærvø postulates that there were at least four dialects that initially developed out of Proto-Iranian, two of which are attested by texts:

1. Old Northwest Iranian (unattested, ancestor of Ossetian)
2. Old Northeast Iranian (unattested, ancestor of Middle Iranian Khotanese and modern Wakhi)
3. Old Central Iranian (attested, includes Avestan and Median, ancestor of most modern Iranian languages)
4. Old Southwest Iranian (attested, includes Old Persian, ancestor of modern Persian)

Note that different terminology is used for the modern languages: Ossetian has often been classified as a "Northeast Iranian" language, while "Northwest Iranian" usually refers to languages to the northwest of Persian, such as Zaza or the Caspian languages.

== Descriptive phonology ==
Proto-Iranian consonant segments
Type		Labial	Dental	Alveolar	Post-Alveolar	Palatal	Velar	Laryngeal
Plosive	voiceless	*p		*t			*k	
Plosive	voiced	*b		*d			*g	
Affricate	voiceless			*c	*č			
Affricate	voiced			*j	*ǰ			
Fricative	voiceless	*f	*θ	*s	*š		*x	*h *H
Fricative	voiced			*z	*ž			
Nasal		*m		*n				
Liquid				*r				
Semivowel						*y	*w	

PI vowel segments
High	*i (*ī)	*u (*ū)
Low	*a *ā	

In addition to the vowels, *H, and *r̥ could function as the syllabic core. In many reconstructions, instances of *iH and *uH occur instead of *ī and *ū.

=== Phonological correspondences ===
PIE		Av	PIE	Av
*p	→	p	*ph₂tḗr "father"	pitar- "father"
*bʰ	→	b	*bʰréh₂tēr "brother"	bratar- "brother"
*t	→	t	*túh₂ "thou"	tū- "thou"
*d	→	d	*dóru "wood"	dāuru "wood"
*dʰ	→	d	*dʰoHneh₂- "grain"	dana- "grain"
*ḱ	→	s	*déḱm̥t "ten"	dasa "ten"
*ǵ	→	z	*ǵónu "knee"	zānu "knee"
*ǵʰ	→	z	*ǵʰimós "cold"	ziiā̊ "winterstorm"
*k	→	x ~ c	*kruh₂rós "bloody"	xrūda "bloody"
*g	→	g ~ z	*h₂éuges- "strength"	aojah "strength"
*gʰ	→	g ~ z	*dl̥h₁gʰós "long"	darəga- "long"
*kʷ	→	k ~ c	*kʷós "who"	kō "who"
*gʷ	→	g ~ j	*gʷou- "cow"	gao- "cow"

Proto-Iranian	Avestan	Old Persian	Persian	Zaza	Kurdish	Pashto	Vedic Sanskrit
*pHtā́ "father"	pitār	pita	پدر pedar	pi/pêr	bav	پلار plar	pitā́
*máHtā "mother" (Note: Reflexes of the stem in daughter languages also refer to deified beings and deities within their respective mythologies/religions: Old English Mōdraniht ('Night of the Mothers'); Celtic and Germanic Matres and Matronae (Latin for 'Mothers and Matrons'); Latvian Māte ('Mother'); Gaulish Dea Matrona ('Divine Mother Goddess'); Sanskrit Matrikas ('Divine Mothers').)	mātar	māta	مادر mâdar	ma/mare	dayk	مور mor	mātár-
*Hácwah 'horse'	aspa	asa (native word)	اسب asb (< Median)	astor	hesp	آس ās (masc.) اسپه aspa (fem.)	||áśva
*bagáh 'portion, part'	baγa	baga (god)	بغ bagh (seen in بغداد)		beş	برخه barxa	bhága
*bráHtā 'brother'	brātar	brātā	برادر barâdar	bırar	bira	ورور wror	bhrā́tr̥
*búHmiš 'earth, land'	būmi	būmiš	بوم bum	bûm			bhū́mi
*mártyah 'mortal, man'	maṣ̌iia	martiya	مرد mard (man)	merde, merdım	mêr(d) (man)	ميړه merrə (husband)	mártya
*mā́Hah 'moon'	mā̊	māha	ماه mâh (moon, month)	aşme	mang, hîv (moon), meh (month)	سپوږمۍ (spozh)may / (spog)may (alt.) مياشت myasht (moon) ((month))	mā́sa
*wáhr̥ 'spring'	vaŋri	vahara	بهار bahâr	wesar	bihar	اوړی worrey (summer)	vāsara 'morning'
*Hr̥táh 'truth'	aša	arta	راست râst (correct)	raşt	rast	رښتيا rishtya / rixtya	r̥tá
*drúxš 'falsehood'	druj	drauga	دروغ dorugh (lie)	zûr	diro, derew (lie)	درواغ dorwagh	druh-
*háwmah 'pressed juice' / 'ephedra'	haoma	hauma-varga	هوم hum	hum		اومه / اومان om'an / om'ə	sóma

== Development into Old Iranian ==
The term Old Iranian refers to the stage in Iranian history represented by the earliest written languages: Avestan and Old Persian. These two languages are usually considered to belong to different main branches of Iranian, and many of their similarities are found also in the other Iranian languages. Regardless, there are many arguments that many of these Old Iranian features may not have occurred yet in Proto-Iranian, and they may have instead spread across an Old Iranian dialect continuum already separated in dialects (see Wave theory). Additionally, most Iranian languages cannot be derived from either attested Old Iranian language: numerous unwritten Old Iranian dialects must have existed, whose descendants surface in the written record only later.

Vocalization of laryngeals

The Proto-Indo-European laryngeal consonants are likely to have been retained quite late in the Indo-Iranian languages in at least some positions. However, the syllabic laryngeal (*H̥) was deleted in non-initial syllables.

*l > *r

This change is found widely across the Iranian languages, indeed Indo-Iranian as a whole: it appears also in Vedic Sanskrit. Avestan has no **/l/ phoneme at all. Regardless many words, for which the other Indo-European languages indicate original *l, still show /l/ in several Iranian languages, including New Persian, Kurdish and Zazaki. These include e.g. Persian lab 'lip', līz- 'to lick', gulū 'throat' (compare e.g. Latin gula); Zazaki lü 'fox' (compare e.g. Latin vulpēs). This preservation is however not systematic, and likely has been mostly diminished through interdialectal loaning of r-forms, and in some cases extended by the loaning of words from smaller western Iranian languages into Persian.

*s > *h

Specifically, this debuccalization occurred when not preceded *k, *n, *p, *t or followed *t (which otherwise retained as *s). This change occurs in all Iranian languages.

Aspirated stops

The Proto-Indo-Iranian aspirated stops *pʰ, *tʰ and *kʰ were spirantized into *f, *θ and *x in most Iranian languages. However, they appear to be reverted into aspirates in Parachi, varieties of Kurdish, and the Saka languages (Khotanese and Tumshuqese, but not Wakhi which retains the fricatives); and to have merged with the voiceless aspirated stops in Balochi. In the case of Saka, secondary influence from Gāndhārī Prakrit is likely.

*c, *dz > *s, *z

The Proto-Indo-European palatovelars *ḱ, *ǵ (and *ǵʰ) were fronted to affricates *ć, *dź in Proto-Indo-Iranian (the affricate stage being preserved in the Nuristani languages). The development in the Old Iranian period shows divergences: Avestan, as also most newer Iranian languages, show /s/ and /z/, while Old Persian shows /θ/ and /d/. (Word-initially, the former develops also into /s/ by Middle Persian.) — The change *c > *s must be also newer than the development *s > *h, since this new *s was not affected by the previous change. The consonant cluster *ts (as in Proto-Indo-Iranian *matsya- "fish") has merged to *c, since both were identical in Iranian.

*cw > *sp

This change also clearly fails to apply to all Iranian languages. Old Persian with its descendants shows /s/, possibly likewise Kurdish and Balochi. The Saka languages show /š/. All other Iranian languages have /sp/, or a further descendant (e.g. /fs/ in Ossetian).

*θr > *c

This change is typical for Old Persian and its descendants, as opposed to Avestan and most languages first attested in the Middle or New Iranian periods. Kurdish and Balochi may again have shared this change as well.
