= Haplogroup R =

Haplogroup R may refer to:

- Haplogroup R (mtDNA), a human mitochondrial DNA (mtDNA) haplogroup
- Haplogroup R (Y-DNA), a human Y-chromosome (Y-DNA) haplogroup
