= Iron people =

Ossetian subgroup

Irons
Ир, Ирæттæ / Ir, Irættæ
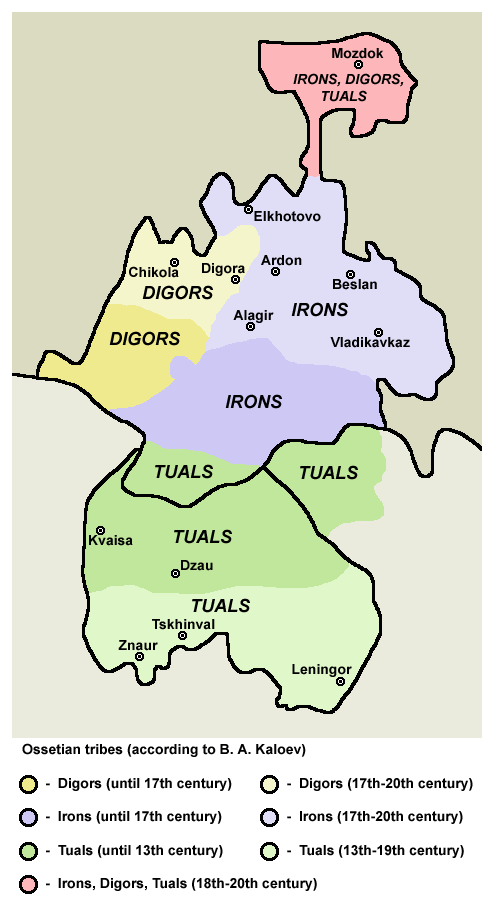

Total population
- est. 200,000

Regions with significant populations
- Russia: North Ossetia–Alania: est. 100,000
- Turkey: unknown
- Syria: unknown

Languages
- Iron (East Ossetian), Russian, Turkish

Religion
- Majority: Orthodox Christianity; Minority: Uatsdin; Sunni Islam

Related ethnic groups
- Digor people

The Irons (East Ossetian: Ирон Iron, pl.: Ир Ir, Ирӕттӕ Irættæ; West Ossetian: Ирон Iron, pl.: Ирӕ Irӕ, Ирӕнттӕ Irænttæ) are a subgroup of the Ossetians. They speak the Iron dialect of the Eastern Iranian Ossetian language. The majority of Irons profess Russian Orthodoxy and a small minority profess Sunni Islam mainly in the lowland villages of North Ossetia, while the Uatsdin faith has also been preserved by a minority of Irons.

== History ==
The ethnonym Iron has the same root, arya, as Iran and many Iranian-speaking peoples, including the precursors of the Iron, the Alana (Alans).

Following the Mongol invasions of Ossetia-Alania of the 1200s and incursions by Tamerlane in the late 1300s, the Alans fled from their homeland to seek refuge in the remote Caucasian valleys while others were incorporated into the conquering society. The Alans who retreated into the Caucasus were unable to reform the Kingdom of Alania and eventually split into different petty subgroups. These petty groups came under the partial influence of their Kabardian neighbors and later became two distinct ethnic groups, the Iron and the Digor.

By the Russian conquest in the late 1700s, Orthodox Christianity had become the dominant religions among the Irons after going through a revival. This is different from the Digors who became majority Islamic.

In the late Soviet period and later in the 1990s, Ossetian intellectuals began to reclaim their Alanian heritage in an attempt to fuse together the Ossetian subgroups who have remained divided on dialect and religion. This led to North Ossetia being renamed North Ossetia-Alania in 1994.

== See also ==
- Ossetians
- North Ossetia–Alania
- Iron (dialect)
