= Digor Ossetian =

Western dialect of Ossetian

Digor
- дигорон ӕвзаг (digoron ævzag)
- Pronunciation: [ˈdigo̞ɾo̞n ʌvˈzɑg]
- Native to: North Caucasus
- Ethnicity: Digors (West Ossetians)
- Native speakers: c. 100,000 (2010)
- Language family: Indo-European: Indo-Iranian; Iranian; Eastern; Northern; Western; Alanic; Ossetian; Digor
- Writing system: Cyrillic (current); Latin (historical)

Official status
- Official language in: Russia: North Ossetia

Language codes
- ISO 639-3: osd
- Glottolog: digo1242

Digor Ossetian (/ˈdɪɡər/; Ossetian: дигорон ӕвзаг, romanized: digoron ævzag, pronounced [ˈdigo̞ɾo̞n ʌvˈzɑg]), also known as Digor Ossetic or Digor-Ossetic, is a dialect of the Ossetian language spoken by the Digor subgroup. It is far less widely spoken than the Iron dialect, the standard Ossetian dialect. The two are distinct enough to sometimes be considered separate languages; in his 2003 Digor–Russian dictionary, the compiler Fedar Takazov refers to a "Digor language", but the editor in the same book uses "Digor dialect".

Digor is spoken in the west of the Republic of North Ossetia (Digora, Chikola, etc.) and in neighboring Kabardino-Balkaria. Digor is used far less than Iron at about a one-to-five ratio and is nearly non-existent in the Republic of South Ossetia.

Digor and Iron are not mutually comprehensible, as there are about 2,500 words in the Digor dialect that do not exist in the Iron dialect, and some North Ossetian scholars still consider Digor a separate language, as it was considered until 1937. The phonetic, morphological, and lexical differences between the two dialects are greater than between Chechen and Ingush, often considered two separate languages.

In 2011 North Ossetia launched a Digor language version of the REGNUM News Agency and adopted two efforts to promote the study of the Digor for young students whose parents have forgotten the dialect, covering the periods 2008–2012 and 2013–2015 respectively. Additionally, at this time, the government of North Ossetia started offering textbooks in Digor.

== See also ==
- Ossetians
- North Ossetia–Alania
- Digor people
