= Iron Ossetian =

Standard dialect of Ossetian

Iron
- Ирон ӕвзаг (Iron ævzag)
- Pronunciation: [ˈiron ɐvˈz̠äk]
- Native to: North Caucasus
- Region: North Ossetia, South Ossetia
- Native speakers: (5/6 of Ossete speakers cited 1981)
- Language family: Indo-European: Indo-Iranian; Iranian; Eastern; Northern; Western; Alanic; Ossetian; Iron
- Dialects: Ir; Tagaur; Alagir; Kurtat

Language codes
- ISO 639-1: os (for both Ossetian and the Iron dialect)
- ISO 639-2: oss (for both Ossetian and the Iron dialect)
- ISO 639-3: oss (for both Ossetian and the Iron dialect)
- Glottolog: iron1242

Alana speaking Iron Ossetian

Iron Ossetian (Iron Ossetic: ирон ӕвзаг, romanized: iron ævzag, pronounced [ˈiron ɐvˈz̠äk]), also known as Iron Ossetic or Iron-Ossetic, is one of the two main dialects of the Ossetic language along with Digor spoken in the Caucasus. The majority of Ossetians speak Iron, notably in the East, South and Central parts of North Ossetia–Alania, while in the West the Digor dialect is more prevalent. The Iron dialect has been the basis of the Ossetian written language since the abolition of the Digor standard in 1939.

The Iron dialect is spoken by the majority of North Ossetians (most of flat Ossetia, as well as the Kurtatin, Tagaur and Alagir gorges).

With insignificant lexical borrowings from Digor dialect, it is the basis of one of the variants of the literary Ossetian language. The North Ossetian radio and television broadcasts in it, and the daily republican newspaper Ræstdzinad (in the Republic of North Ossetia-Alania) is published.

== Phonology ==
In North Ossetia, as a result of migration from the mountains to the foothill plains, the vocal differences in the Iron dialect leveled out with the displacement of other dialects by the "socating" (by the pronunciation of ts - phoneme /s/) Kurtatin dialect.

== See also ==
- Iron people
