= Printed media in the Soviet Union =

Printed media in the Soviet Union, i.e., newspapers, magazines and journals, were under strict control of the CPSU and the Soviet state. The desire to disseminate propaganda was believed to have been the driving force behind the creation of the early Soviet newspapers. Newspapers were the essential means of communicating with the public, which meant that they were the most powerful way available to spread propaganda and capture the hearts of the population. Additionally, within the Soviet Union the press evolved into the messenger for the orders from the CPSU Central Committee to the party officials and activists. Due to this important role, the Soviet papers were both prestigious in the society and an effective means to control the masses; however, manipulation initially was not the only purpose of the Soviet press.

== Early Soviet Union ==
- Bednota (The Poor Folk): a daily newspaper for peasants, issued by Central Committee of the Communist Party in Moscow, Russia, 1918–1931.
- Zhizn' Natsional'nostei (Life of the Nationalities): a journal published by Narkomnats in Moscow, 1918–1924.

=== Newspaper ===
==== Beginnings ====
The Soviet newspaper industry began in the underground movements that created Pravda, meaning 'truth', which on 5 May 1912 was published as a political newspaper. Pravda did not start as a political publication, but instead was a journal of social life. Yet in 1912 Vladimir Lenin would decide that the party needed a voice in the news industry and that Pravda could convey the party's desires.

==== Distribution ====
Government subsidization allowed newspapers to be priced low and distributed widely. Newspapers were distributed by government administrations which had three streams of revenue. One stream was subscriptions that people would pay to read. A second was advertisements either within or provided alongside some newspapers, which was primarily done in city newspapers rather than rural. Lastly, newspapers received substantial subsidies from their parent organization. Because the Soviet planned economy had no capital costs for organisations, all costs being borne by the state, if the Central Committee of the Communist Party decided to publish a paper it would build the plant, equip it, and then turn it over free of charge to the newspaper's publishing organisation. Yet, there were attempts to achieve economies of scale, and major publications would produce smaller more class-oriented papers because the parent government administration publishing the paper would cover the capital investments. This capital investment cost coverage, which was not limited to a single production plant. It allowed papers, such as Pravda, to be distributed across the entire Soviet Union in one morning, which was a feat that Western papers such as The New York Times would not achieve for twenty-five or more years. On the down side, the Soviets had set up a system in which everyone would receive their news at relatively the same time. Most of these stories came from the Telegraphic Agency of the Soviet Union, making it both a news agency and the main distributor of government information. And so, the Telegraphic Agency of the Soviet Union was similar to the United States White House Press Secretary heading the Associated Press. A side effect of the Telegraphic agency being the most important source was that many stories could not be covered until the agency itself had covered it. Also, this distribution of news by the government meant that not everyone could read the same publications. Governmental clearances thus dictated who could read what.

==== Staff ====
The time period from the New Economic Policy of 1921 to 1928 to the "Great Break" of 1928 to 1932 comprises the period of large soviet press transformations. In the 1920s, during the New Economic Policy period, the Soviet Press was concerned with the education of the poorer classes. To achieve that, a broadly educated newspaper staff would be necessary. Yet, at the beginning of the 1920s, the Soviet Newspapers were not only under staffed, the journalists were themselves undereducated and they lacked any journalistic skill. Because of this, the Press Corps strived to raise the standards of the press, while at the same time maintaining strong party support from the journalists. During this time the Soviet Press's main objective was to disseminate party ideology to the lower classes, but it also intended to act as the watchdog to protect the people from increasing corruption, and as the emissary from the people to the party regime. This resulted in an apparent conflict of purpose. Soviet journalists prided themselves in their professionalism at this time, all while accepting the Bolshevik Party as the ruling authority. However, the Press Corps distrusted anyone who was a white-collar employee, or a member of the academia, believing that an individual's class would predetermine their attitude towards the Bolshevik Party (the assumption being that white-collar professionals and academics looked unfavorably on the ruling Bolsheviks). Due to this assumption, the Press Corps had a preference for training members of the proletariat, or more specifically the poor or middle class peasants as journalists. Thus, a conflict arose between the desire to hire people the press corps trusted, and finding skilled journalists who could succeed in the goal of educating and equalizing the masses. However, the denial that this conflict existed led to the Soviet Newspapers to being staffed by persons with an uncomfortable combination of ideologies. The conflict ended when a large movement favoring party ideology and background emerged, culminating in 1924, when the State Institute of Journalism determined they would train only those with trusted ideological backgrounds to be journalists for the Soviet Newspapers. In reality, this was only a façade, as the institute continued to train members of academia and the white-collar class, with 29 percent of the admitted applicants having less than one year with the party Stazh (qualification course), which was the required minimum for former Komsomol (young communist) members. The supply of journalist students that fit the proper ideological background could not meet the demand for professional and competent journalists for the prestigious spots, which explains the large number of party switchers. Yet the façade was needed to convey party propaganda. The State Institute of Journalism broke its own ideological rules in order to meet its professional standards and goals by accepting better educated but less ideologically centered students.

The interesting and conflicted mix that occurred from the government's need for party propaganda to be conveyed by individuals with journalistic skill was the true beginning of the professional Soviet News Media. Throughout the 1920s the State Institute of Journalism would continue to produce a standardized curriculum to meet their goals of producing competent and professional journalists, however, this led to a curriculum in a constant state of flux. Additionally, a clear class distinction developed between editors and journalists that would continue throughout the 1920s and even through the 1928 Shakhty trial, the beginning of "charges against class enemies." The distinctions that began to form underlined the Communist parties fear of professionals and class systems. All of this culminated in the 1930s when the State Institute of Journalism ended its drive for professional journalism and standards purged the old faculty at the Institute of Journalism, and government officials revised the entire curriculum to meet propaganda goals.

== Late Soviet Union ==
=== Newspapers ===
==== Circulation ====
In 1988 the Soviet Union published more than 8,000 daily newspapers in approximately sixty languages, with a combined circulation of about 170 million. Every all-union newspaper was circulated in its Russian language version. Nearly 3,000 newspapers, however, reached the population in non-Russian languages, constituting roughly 25 percent of the total circulation, although non-Russians made up almost 50 percent of the population.

Press technology in the Soviet Union during the 1970s and 1980s was based upon hot-type lead, which was behind that of their western counterparts, which had transitioned to cold type, photo type settings. This was largely due to the subsidy program, which took away from the news industries incentive to produce new technology by reducing competition. Although the technology in the Soviet Union print media was less advanced, the shortcomings were made up for by brute economic force. Working at a subsidized scale not present in the US allowed the Soviet press to widely distribute publications across the USSR.

==== Staff ====
Most of newspaper reporters and editors belonged to the Communist Party-controlled Union of Journalists, composed of nearly 74,000 members. In 1988 some 80 percent of the union's reporters and editors were party members. Inevitably, assignments of editors had to be approved by the party. In the late 1980s, all the central editors in chief of major all-union newspapers belonged to the Central Committee of the Communist Party of the Soviet Union.

The party also sought to control journalists by combining higher education and Higher Party Schools with schools of journalism. Reporters and editors thus were trained under the aegis of the professional party elite. For newspaper journalists and television and radio reporters, newspaper photographers, and literary editors, Moscow University's School of Journalism provided a main conduit to party positions concerned with the media. In the 1980s, some 2,500 graduate, undergraduate, evening school, and correspondence students annually graduated from the School of Journalism. Students were taught party strictures within the following eight departments: Theory and Practice of the Party-Soviet Press, History of the Party-Soviet Press, Television and Radio Broadcasting, Movie-making and Editorial-publishing Work, Foreign Press and Literature, Russian Journalism and Literature, Stylistics of the Russian language, and Techniques of Newspaper Work and Information Media. By the late 1980s, Moscow University's School of Journalism had graduated approximately 100,000 journalists.

==== Late developments ====
In the late 1980s, newspapers gradually developed new formats and new issues. Under Yuri Andropov, Pravda began to print short reports of weekly Politburo meetings. Eventually, other major newspapers published accounts of these meetings as well.

Under Mikhail Gorbachev, Politburo reports expanded to provide more details on the leadership's thinking about domestic and foreign affairs. Before Gorbachev's assumption of power, Western sources had identified a partial list of proscribed topics, which included crime, drugs, accidents, natural disasters, occupational injuries, official organs of censorship, security, intelligence, schedules of travel for the political leadership, arms sales abroad, crime or morale problems in the armed forces, hostile actions against Soviet citizens abroad, and special payments and education for athletes. After 1985 Gorbachev's policy of openness gave editors a freer hand to publish information on many of these subjects.

In the 1980s, regional newspapers differed in several ways from all-union newspapers. The distribution of regional newspapers varied from circulation at the republic level to circulation in a province, city, or district. The party allowed many regional newspapers to print most of their issues in the region's native language, which reflected the Stalinist policy of "national in form, socialist in content." Local newspaper circulation remained restricted to a region. These publications often focused on such issues as local heroes who contributed to the good of the community or significant problems (as expressed in letters to the editor) relating to crime or natural disasters. By contrast, after Gorbachev came to power, most all-union newspapers began to report on societal shortcomings. However, in the late 1980s regional papers continued to contain more personal advertisements and local merchant notices than the all-union newspapers, if the latter carried any at all.

==== Letters to the editor ====
Originally, Vladimir Lenin argued that criticism should be channeled through letters to the editor and would assist in cleansing society of its problems. He believed that public discussion would facilitate the elimination of shortcomings and that open expression of problems would create a significant feedback mechanism for the leadership and for the country as a whole. Lenin's ideas in this regard were not carried out by Joseph Stalin and Nikita Khrushchev, who apparently believed the party needed no assistance from the people in identifying problems. But in 1981, Leonid Brezhnev created the Central Committee Letters Department, and later Andropov called for more letters to editors to expose corruption and mismanagement. Konstantin Chernenko advocated that greater "media efficacy" be instituted so that newspapers, for example, would carry more in-depth and current analyses on pressing issues. Gorbachev expanded the flexibility allowed by giving newspapers leeway in publishing letters critical of society and even critical of the government.

Newspaper letters departments usually employed large staffs and handled extremely high volumes of letters daily. Not all letters were published because they often dealt with censored subjects or their numbers simply posed too great a burden for any one newspaper to handle. The letters departments, however, reportedly took their work very seriously and in the late 1980s were used by the press to encourage the population to improve society.

Letters to editors on a great number of previously forbidden topics also elicited responses from the population that could be manipulated by the Soviet newspapers to influence public opinion in the desired direction. Because party members made up the majority of active newspaper readers, according to polls conducted in the Soviet Union, they wrote most of the letters to the editor. Thus, their perspectives probably colored the newspapers' letters sections.

== Publications ==
=== Major newspapers ===
Translations of names given in parentheses.

Of all the newspapers, Pravda (Truth), an organ of the CPSU Central Committee, was the most authoritative and, therefore, the most important. Frequently, it was the bellwether for important events, and readers often followed its news leads to detect changes in policies. With about 12 million copies circulated every day to over 20 million citizens, Pravda focused on party events and domestic and foreign news.

Other newspapers, however, also commanded wide circulation. Izvestiya (News), the second most authoritative paper, emanated from the Presidium of the Supreme Soviet and in the late 1980s circulated to between 8 and 10 million people daily. Izvestiya also contained official government information and general news and an expanded Sunday section composed of news analysis, feature stories, poetry, and cartoons.

Trud (Labor), issued by the Soviet Labor Unions, circulated six days a week, reaching 8 to 9 million people. It emphasized labor and economic analyses and included other official decrees.

Komsomolskaya Pravda (Komsomol Truth), published by the Komsomol, was distributed to between 9 and 10 million people. Being youth oriented the paper tackled Komsomol policies and youth issues in general. Its more junior counterpart, the Pionerskaya Pravda (Pioneers' Truth), the official daily of the Vladimir Lenin All-Union Pioneer Organization, aimed at children up to 14, focused on children's issues, education and sports among others.

Krasnaya Zvezda (Red Star), published by the Ministry of Defence of the Soviet Union, covered most daily military news and events and published military human interest stories and exposes.

The literary bimonthly Literaturnaya Gazeta (Literary Gazette) disseminated the views of the USSR Union of Writers and contained authoritative statements and perspectives concerning literature, plays, cinema, and literary issues of popular interest.

A publication of the Central Committee, Sovetskaya Rossiya (Soviet Russia), was the Russian Republic's most widely distributed newspaper, with a circulation of nearly 12 million.

The major sports newspaper, Sovetskiy Sport, published by the government and VTsSPS, in cooperation with the National Council for Physical Culture and Sport, had a circulation of 5 million. The topics covered were all about sports news and features, and in the lead-up to various national and international sports competitions, gave a preview of the USSR's national team, the various national athletic teams and organizations, and various republican teams and athletes.

A weekly regional newspaper, Moskovskiye Novosti (Moscow News), appeared in both Russian and English editions and reported on domestic and international events. It became very popular during the late 1980s, both in the Soviet Union and abroad.

The weekly newspaper Za Rubezhom (Abroad) devoted its pages exclusively to international affairs and foreign events.

Finally, Sotsialisticheskaya Industriya (Socialist Industry), a daily newspaper, concentrated on industrial and economic events, statistics, and human interest stories, mostly aimed at those in the labor force.

=== Republican and regional newspapers ===
Republican, regional, and local newspapers were published in dozens of languages, even very minor ones. For example, the Khakas language newspaper Lenin choly (Ленин чолы) printed around 6.000 copies, three times a week, for the around 60.000 speakers of the language. Below is a non-exhaustive table of those newspapers; it generally includes the most important newspaper published in each language, with their designation in the late 1980s.

Original name	Transliterarion	Meaning	Republic/Region	Language	current name
Алтайдыҥ чолмоны	Altaydyn cholmony	The Star of Altai	Gorno-Altai AO	Altai	Алтайдыҥ чолмоны
Аҧсны ҟаҧш	Apsny kapsh	Red Abkhazia	Abkhaz ASSR	Abkhaz	Аҧсны
БагӀараб байрахъ	Baarab bairakh	Red Flag	Dagestan ASSR	Avar	XӀакъикъат
ביראָבידזשאנער שטערן	Birobidzhaner Shtern	Birobidzhan Star	Jewish AO	Yiddish	ביראָבידזשאנער שטערן
Буряад унэн	Buryad Unen	The Buryat Truth	Buryat ASSR	Buryat	Буряад үнэн
Дагестанская правда	Dagestanskaya Pravda	Daghestan's Truth	Dagestan ASSR	Russian	
Edasi	--	Go Forth	Estonia	Estonian	folded
Заря Востока	Zarya Vostoka	Eastern Dawn	Georgia	Russian	Свободная Грузия / folded 2011
Звезда Алтая	Zvezda Altaya	The Star of Altai	Gorno-Altai AO	Russian	
Звязда	Zvyazda	Star	Byelorussia	Belarusian	Звязда
Казахстанская правда	Kazakhstaskaya Pravda	The Kazakh Truth	Kazakhstan	Russian	
Коммунизм алашара	Kommunizm alashara	The Light of Communism	Karachay–Cherkess AO	Abazin	Абазашта
Коммунизм ялавĕ	Kommunizm yalave	The Flag of Communism	Chuvash ASSR	Chuvash	Хыпар
Коммунист	Kommunist	The Communist	Dagestan ASSR	Lezgin	Лезги газет
Коммунист	Kommunist	The Communist	Armenia	Russian	
Коммунист	Kommunist	The Communist	Azerbaijan	Azerbaijani	
Коммунист Таджикистана	Kommunist Tadzhikistana	The Communist of Tajikistan	Tajikistan	Russian	
კომუნისტი	Komunisti	The Communist	Georgia	Georgian	
Красное знамя	Krasnoye Znamya	Red Flag	Komi ASSR	Russian	
Кызыл таң	Kyzyl Tan	Red Dawn	Bashkir ASSR	Tatar	Кызыл таң
Кыым	Kyym	Spark	Yakut ASSR	Yakut	Кыым
Ленин байрагъы	Lenin Bayrağı	Lenin's Flag	Uzbekistan	Crimean Tatar	Янъы дюнья / Yañı Dünya
Ленин ёлу	Lenin yolu	Lenin's Path	Dagestan ASSR	Kumyk	Ёлдаш
Ленин йолы	Lenin yoly	Lenin's Path	Karachay–Cherkess AO	Nogai	Ногай давысы
Ленинан некъ	Leninan nek'	Lenin's Path	Chechen-Ingush ASSR	Chechen	Даймохк
레닌기치	lenin kichi	Lenin's Path	Kazakhstan	Korean	고려일보
Ленин чолы	Lenin choly	Lenin's Path	Khakas AO	Khakas	
Ленинская правда	Leninskaya Pravda	Lenin's Truth	Karelian ASSR	Russian	Курьер Карелии
Марий коммуна	Marii kommuna	The Mari Commune	Mari ASSR	Meadow Mari	Марий Эл
Молдова сочиалистэ	Moldova Socialistă	Socialist Moldavia	Moldavia	Moldavian	Moldova Suverană
Мокшень правда	Mokshen' Pravda	The Moksha Truth	Mordovian ASSR	Moksha Mordvin	Мокшень правда
Neuvosto-Karjala	--	Soviet Karelia	Karelian ASSR	Finnish	Karjalan Sanomat
Правда Востока	Pravda Vostoka	The Eastern Truth	Uzbekistan	Russian	
Правда Севера	Pravda Severa	The Northern Truth	Arkhangelsk Oblast	Russian	
Правда Украины	Pravda Ukraini	The Ukrainian Truth	Ukraine	Russian	
Радянська Україна	Radyanska Ukraina	Soviet Ukraine	Ukraine	Ukrainian	Демократическая Украина
Rahva hääl	--	People's Voice	Estonia	Estonian	folded
Р'йа т'әзә	Ria Taza	New Path	Armenia	Kurdish	
Рæстдзинад	Ræstdzinad	Truth	Northern Ossetian ASSR	Ossetian	Рæстдзинад
საბჭოთა აფხაზეთი	Sabchota Abkhazeti	Soviet Abkhazia	Abkhaz ASSR	Georgian	folded early 1990s
საბჭოთა აჭარა	Sabchota Adzhara	Soviet Adzharia	Adjar ASSR	Georgian	
საბჭოთა ოსეთი	Sabchota Oseti	Soviet Ossetia	South Ossetian AO	Georgian	folded 1990
Сердало	Serdalo	Shine	Chechen-Ingush ASSR	Ingush	Сердало
Совет Башҡортостаны	Sovet Bashkortostany	Soviet Bashkiria	Bashkir ASSR	Bashkir	Башҡортостан
Совет Каракалпакстаны	Sovet Karakalpakstany	Soviet Karakalpakstan	Karakalpak ASSR	Karakalpak	Еркин Қарақалпақстан
Совет кенди	Sovet kendi	Soviet village	Azerbaijan	Azerbaijani	
Совет Тожикистони	Sovet Tojikistoni	Soviet Tajikistan	Tajikistan	Uzbek	Халқ овози
Совет Түркменистаны	Sovet Türkmenistany	Soviet Turkmenistan	Turkmenistan	Turkmen	Türkmenistan
Совет Ўзбекистони	Sovet O'zbekistoni	Soviet Uzbekistan	Uzbekistan	Uzbek	Oʻzbekiston ovozi
Սովետական Ղարաբաղ	Sovetakan Karabakh	Soviet Karabakh	Nagorno-Karabakh AO	Armenian	
Սովետական Հայաստան	Sovetakan Hayastan	Soviet Armenia	Armenia	Armenian	
Սովետական Ղարաբաղ	Sovetakan Vrastan	Soviet Georgia	Georgia	Armenian	
Советтик Кыргызстан	Sovettik Kyrgyzstan	Soviet Kyrghizia	Kirghizia	Kyrgyz	Кыргыз туусу
Советон Ирыстон	Soveton Ironston	Soviet Ossetia	South Ossetian AO	Ossetian	Хурзæрин
Советская Абхазия	Sovetskaya Akbhazia	Soviet Abkhazia	Abkhaz ASSR	Russian	
Советская Аджария	Sovetskaya Adzharia	Soviet Adzharia	Adjar ASSR	Russian	
Советская Башкирия	Sovetskaya Bashkria	Soviet Bashkiria	Bashkir ASSR	Russian	
Советская Белоруссия	Sovetskaya Belorussia	Soviet Byelorussia	Byelorussian SSR	Russian	
Советская Киргизия	Sovetskaya Kirgizia	Soviet Kyrgyzstan	Kirghizia	Russian	Slovo Kyrgyzstana
Советская Латвия	Sovetskaya Latviya	Soviet Latvia	Latvia	Russian	folded 1991
Советская Литва	Sovetskaya Litva	Soviet Lithuania	Lithuania	Russian	
Советская Молдавия	Sovetskaya Moldavia	Soviet Moldova	Moldavia	Russian	
Советская Мордовия	Sovetskaya Mordovia	Soviet Mordovia	Mordovian ASSR	Russian	Известия Мордовии
Советская Россия	Sovetskaya Rossiya	Soviet Russia	Russian SFSR	Russian	
Советская Татария	Sovetskaya Tatariya	Soviet Tatarstan	Tatar ASSR	Russian	Республика Татарстан
Советская Чувашия	Sovetskaya Chuvashiya	Soviet Chuvasia	Chuvash ASSR	Russian	Советская Чувашия
Советская Эстония	Sovetskaya Estoniya	Soviet Estonia	Estonia	Russian	Эстония
Советской Удмуртия	Sovetskoi Udmurtia	Soviet Udmurtia	Udmurt ASSR	Udmurt	Удмурт дунне
Социалистическэ Адыгей	Sotsialisticheske Adygey	Socialist Adyghea	Adyghe AO	Adyghe	Адыгэ макъ
Социалистік Қазақстан	Sotsialistik Qazaqstan	Socialist Kazakhstan	Kazakhstan	Kazakh	Егемен Қазақстан
Социалистик Татарстан	Sotsialistik Tatarstan	Socialist Tatarstan	Tatar ASSR	Tatar	Ватаным Татарстан
Тоҷикистони Советӣ	Todzhikiston Sovetii	Soviet Tajikistan	Tajikistan	Tajik	Джумхурият
Tiesa	--	Truth	Lithuania	Lithuanian	folded 1994
Туркменская искра	Turkmenskaya Iskra	The Turkmen Spark	Turkmenistan	Russian	
Cīņa	--	The Fight	Latvia	Latvian	
Шарк Капысы	Şərq Qapısı	The Gate of the East	Nakhichevan ASSR	Azerbaijani	Şərq Qapısı
Шин	Shin	Truth	Tuvan ASSR	Tuvan	
Czerwony Sztandar	--	The Red Flag	Lithuania	Polish	Kurier Wileński
Хальмг Унн	Khalmg Unn	The Kalmyk Truth	Kalmyk ASSR	Kalmyk	Хальмг үнн
Шийүәди чи	Shiyüadi chi	Flag of October	Kirghizia	Dungan	Хуэймин бо
Эрзянь правда	Erzyan Pravda	The Erzya Truth	Mordovian ASSR	Erzya Mordvin	Эрзян Мастор
Югыд туй	Yugyd Tui	The Milky Way	Komi ASSR	Komi	Коми му

=== Magazines and journals ===
In the late 1980s, weekly, monthly, and quarterly magazines and journals numbered almost 5,500 and had a circulation nearly equal to that of the daily newspapers. The same CPSU regulations and guidelines that applied to newspapers extended to magazines and journals. In the mid-1980s, under the regime's less-restrictive censorship policy, both magazines and journals published articles and stories to fill in historical "blank spots." These articles included works of past and contemporary authors once banned and new works that challenged the limits imposed on literary society by previous leaders. Assessments and criticisms of past leaderships exposed many historical atrocities, particularly those committed under Stalin. As a result, in the late 1980s the number of subscribers to periodicals climbed considerably, and magazines and journals frequently sold out at kiosks within minutes.

In the late 1980s, these magazines and journals created reverberations throughout society with their publication of controversial articles.

Krokodil (Crocodile), one of the most popular magazines with a circulation of approximately 6 million, contained humor and satire and featured excellent artistic political cartoons and ideological messages.

Nedelya (Week), another magazine, was published as a weekly supplement to Izvestiya newspaper and appeared every Sunday, having a circulation of some 9 to 10 million.

Such journals as Ogonyok (Little Fire), a weekly that became more popular in the late 1980s because of its insightful political exposes, human interest stories, serialized features, and pictorial sections, had an audience of over 2 million people. In 1986 it published excerpted works by the previously banned writer Nikolai Gumilev, who was shot in 1921 after being accused of writing a counterrevolutionary proclamation. In 1988 it also published excerpts of poetry from Yuliy Daniel, imprisoned after a famous 1966 trial for publication of his work abroad.

Novy Mir (New World), one of the most controversial and often original literary reviews, attracted widespread readership among the intelligentsia. The monthly publication reached nearly 2 million readers and concentrated on new prose, poetry, criticism, and commentary. Many previously banned works were published in its pages, most notably Doctor Zhivago by Boris Pasternak. The publication of Doctor Zhivago in the West not only resulted in Pasternak's expulsion from the Union of Writers in 1956 but won him the 1958 Nobel Prize for Literature.

Oktyabr (October), a journal resembling Novy Mir in content, circulation, and appeal, espoused more conservative viewpoints. Nevertheless, Anna Akhmatova's "Requiem" a poetic tribute to those who perished during Stalin's purges, appeared in its November 1987 issue.

Sovetskaya Kultura (Soviet Culture), a journal with broad appeal, published particularly biting indictments of collectivization, industrialization, and the purges of the 1930s. In 1988 the journal published articles indirectly criticizing Lenin for sanctioning the establishment of the system of forced labor camps.

=== Books ===
Notable book publishers of the Soviet Union include Progress Publishers, which produced much of the English-language translations of the works of Marx and Engels for export to the West.

=== Censorship ===
The Soviet Press conducted pre-publication censorship under an organization called Glavlit, which was the chief administrative arm of the censorship of the Press, and had a presence in every newsroom. The press provided the transmission belt by which these organizations sent information to their representatives in the general public. Each had censors to insure that the journalist did not go further than were allowed by the government that would read through every article prior to publication. This degree of censorship was not only for soviet writers but foreign correspondents who wrote for western publications.

=== Criticism ===
==== Internal (Soviet News Industry) ====
The Soviet press's purpose differed from the western press in that the Soviet papers also served as public forums to criticize and improve the function of businesses and institutions serving the communities. For example, a worker might send a letter to a local paper describing how his place of business could build more widgets per day if the factory kept more replacement parts in stock. Then if that letter had been written clearly enough, or could be edited easily, and the content was considered to have enough value, and the censors approved, it would be published in the local paper for the entire community to read rather than merely being brought-up in an improvement meeting held within the business.

The Soviet press was passionate about the role of improving the function of society, solving problems, and squelching corruption. In such, the journalists' complaints had more to do with lack of space for important issues in the smaller regional print media and over repetition of large political issues already given coverage in the major papers than any criticism political propaganda because they worked as "organs of the ruling party."

Following World War II the Soviet press became more concerned about the "stylistic perfection" of journalists and started to reduce the number of published letters from actual workers in favor of more professionally written articles. In one such example, in the early 1950s the party's Gorky oblast paper (a small regional) had 1,890 worker correspondents and 1,150 village correspondents, and reduced that to 530 and 550 respectively. Young journalists working as editors of these submissions from workers and villagers had complained that the "re-writing" was a type of "donkey-work" and was less dignified than writing for other departments. These opinions, though rejected by the papers, were a sign of the underlying loss of consciousness of the traditional functions of the press.

The function of being the community's forum for criticism meant that the papers received letters that ranged in subject matter from a girl criticizing a boyfriend's mother (which did get published) to calling out party officials on corruption. The editors then needed to make delicate judgments on what subjects to investigate in order to authenticate, and when to publish anonymously in order to protect the author from recrimination. Advice was even given to punish those who took revenge on the authors of published criticisms.

From Schlesinger's writing on the subject it is clear that the journalists he reviewed felt that this was not always done in the best manner and that the time and energy required to sort through criticisms from such a broad field of correspondents resulted in important content being lost in the melee. The number of censorships it must pass through further bogged down journalistic content. "No line can go to press without the initials of the acting editor and, additionally, of the responsible [party] secretary." Add to that the problem that the editorial staff and party secretary often had no education on the subject they were tasked to vet, and important content was often completely lost.

The most frequent criticism by the journalists was on the lack of the institutions to react to the complaints published about them. As a case in point, Romanov noted that Stroitelnaya Gazeta received no replies to the 112 critical articles or the 575 forwarded letters to the institutions regarding the "pleas for relief." He added that that specific example was in no way exceptional.

To the Soviets, the press represented the public, and took pride in creating change such as how drunk drivers who had caused a death were prosecuted. The journalists expressed frustration, though; in how other court cases were reported. For example, because the press wanted to convey faith that offenders would be caught and punished, the papers would not publish articles on crimes where no perpetrator had been identified. Particularly offensive was the lack of press on murders where no suspect was prosecuted.

==== External (Soviet) ====
An old Soviet joke was that "there is no information in Izvestia, there is no truth in Pravda," Izvestia meaning information and Pravda meaning truth. Thus, the Russian populace regarded the major publications with a great deal of cynicism. The papers were, however, information transmission belts, so people would try to decipher what was going on by reading them. Soviet papers were written in such a way that the beginnings of articles would have a list of what was going well, and then would transition with a "however" to the real news. So, many people would read from the "however" in the hopes to get at the real story.

== See also ==
- Media of the Soviet Union
- Mass media in Communist Czechoslovakia
- Television in the Soviet Union
- Radio in the Soviet Union

Censorship & propaganda:

- Eastern Bloc information dissemination
- Censorship of images in the Soviet Union
- Censorship in the Soviet Union
- Propaganda in the Soviet Union
