= Jász =

Jász may refer to:

- Jász people
- Jász language
- Jász-Nagykun-Szolnok, a county in Hungary
- Jász-Nagykun-Szolnok (former county), a county in the historical Kingdom of Hungary
- Jászság (Jász), a historical and geographical region in Hungary
- Jász, the Hungarian name for Iaz village, Obreja Commune, Caraş-Severin County, Romania
