= Jassic =

Jassic (Yassic) can refer to:

- Jassic people
- Jassic language
