= Shagit Hudayberdin =

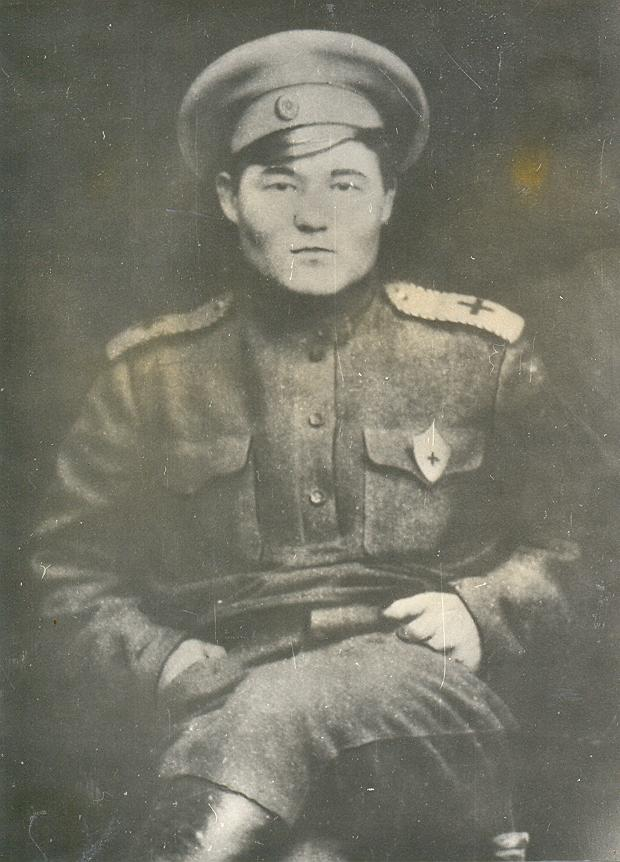
Shagit Hudayberdin in the Russian Army, 1914

Shagit Hudayberdin (Bashkir: Hozaybirzin Şehit Ahmet ulı; 9 October 1896 – 21 December 1924) was a Bashkir revolutionary active in the Russian Revolution. From 23 November 1921 to March 1922 he was the Responsible Secretary of the Bashkir Regional Committee of the All-Union Communist Party (Bolsheviks).

== Biography ==
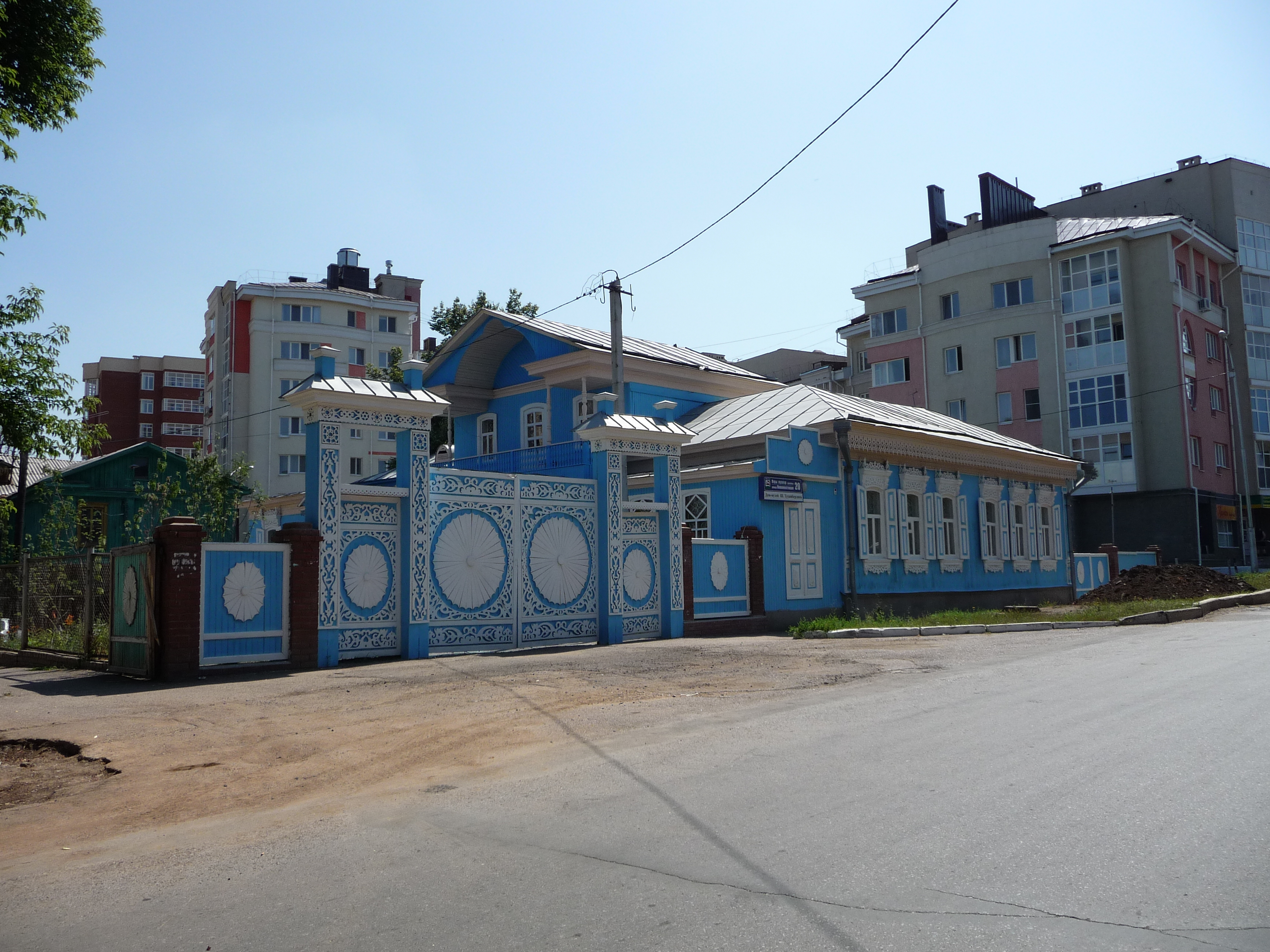
The house in which the revolutionary Shagit Hudayberdin lived and worked. Novomostovaya Street, 20, Ufa. Now is Hudayberdin museum.

Shagit Hudayberdin was born on October 9, 1896, in the village, formerly called Piancino, in 1924 renamed Khudayberdino (Kugarchinsky District of Bashkortostan). The elementary Russian Bashkir School was opened there. After finishing it he entered the Orenburg madrasa "Khusainiya". In 1914, for agitation against the administration regime, Hudayberdin was excluded from the madrasa.

Since the beginning of the First World War, Hudayberdin was drafted into the Russian imperial army, which interrupted his training in a madrasa. Having completed short-term medical attendant courses, he was sent to the front as a company medical assistant. After being seriously wounded on the Austrian front in 1916, he returned to Ufa. The February Revolution is greeted by the soldier of the 144th reserve rifle regiment in Ufa. In the Ufa garrison there were several thousand soldiers, among whom were many Muslims. He actively participates in the soldiers' democratic movement, becoming a member of the Ufa Muslim Military Council, is a member of the editorial board of Soldat Telyage (Desire of a Soldier), writes stories, poems, articles, leads a revolutionary campaign for ending the imperialist war, for transferring all power to the Soviets leading a revolutionary work among the Bashkirs and Tatars, defending internationalist positions.

In May 1917, the Ufa Muslim Military Council was organized. Shagit Hudayberdin became a member of the editorial board of the newspaper Желание солдата and became an active correspondent.

Hudayberdin was actively involved in the strengthening of Soviet power. On October 29, 1917, at a general meeting of the Ufa Muslim Military Council, he read out a decision supporting the slogan "All power to the Soviets!" (Vsya vlast sovyetam!) and the Soviet government. On November 30, he was elected along with the Bolsheviks N. Bryukhanov, A. Svidersky, A. Cheverev, T. Krivov, A. Tsyurupa, E. Kadomtsev to the Ufa provincial executive committee of the Soviets, becoming a member of the revolutionary military tribunal of the Sterlitamak fortified district, a member of the board of the Muslim committee on Bashkir Affairs. In March 1918, he moved from the social-revolutionary to the Russian Communist Party(b), was engaged in agitation work among the Bashkir and Tatar people during the rebellion of the White Czechs and created a Muslim detachment. During the battles of Bugulma, Hudayberdin is wounded, and he is sent to a hospital. Having healed, he worked for some time in Moscow at the Central Muslim Commissariat, managing his Bashkir department. Returning to the political department of the 5th Army of the Eastern Front, he campaigns among Muslim soldiers, published in the newspaper «Кызыл яу», where he actively criticizes the counter-revolutionary activities of Zeki Velidi Togan, one of the leaders of the Bashkir national movement.

Hudayberdin participates in the liberation of Ufa in 1919. Becomes a member of the Ufa Provincial Provisional Revolutionary Committee. Then he is appointed head of the Revolutionary Committee Committee for Muslim Affairs, approved by the chairman of the Muslim section of the Communists under the Ufa provincial committee of the RCP (b).

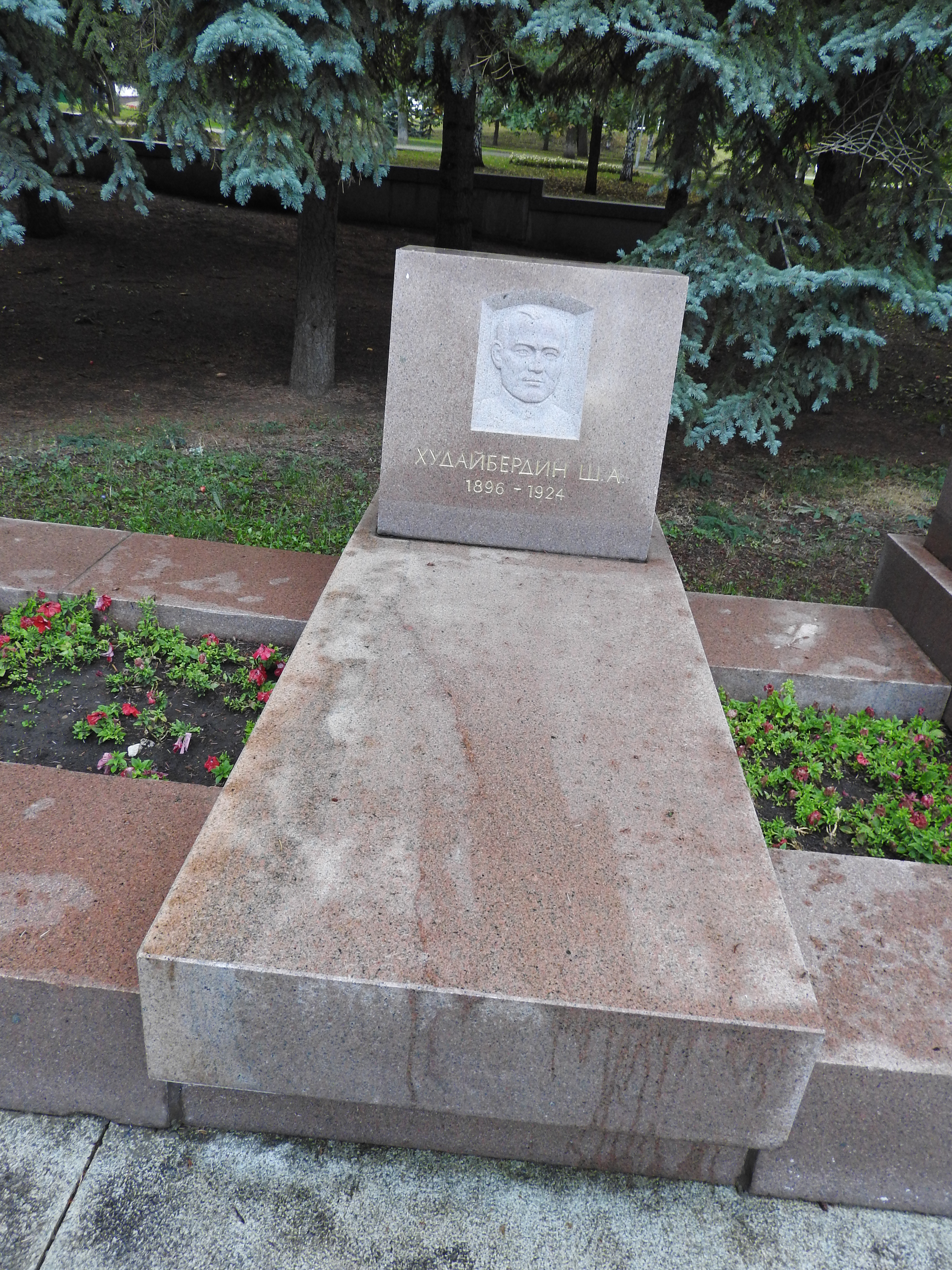
Grave of Hudayberdin Sh.G. in Matrosov Park in Ufa, now Park them. V.I. Lenin

As a political worker of the 5th Army, which pursued Kolchak to the East, leaves Ufa, with battles it reaches Petropavlovsk. In the post of division commander at the end of 1919 he returned to Bashkiria, transferred to state and party work. He heads the Burzyan-Tangaur Kantispolkom and Kantcom RCP (b). In 1920, he was elected a delegate to the 10th Congress of the RCP (b) and a candidate member of the Presidium of the Bashobkom RCP (b), a member of the BashTsIK. Participated in the suppression of the counter-revolutionary Kronstadt rebellion. Was injured. He lay in the hospital. In 1921–1924, he worked as chairman of the Bashkir CEC, political (first) secretary of the Bashobkom RCP (b), deputy people's commissar of agriculture, until the end of his life he headed the people's commissariat of internal affairs .

Hudayberdin is actively involved in the political life of the Bashkir Republic. He is a delegate of many soldiers, farmhands, peasant congresses, state commissions. Under his leadership, work was carried out on the formation of the norms of the modern Bashkir literary language and its introduction into clerical work as the state language of the republic.

Member of the editorial board of the Bashkortostan newspaper, was a delegate to the X and XI Congress of the RCP (b). Together with other delegates of the 10th Congress of the RCP (B), he participated in the suppression of the Kronstadt insurgency, where he was seriously wounded.

In November 1924, Hudayberdin left for a meeting in Moscow, where the consequences of his injury sharply worsened. He was taken to the clinic of Moscow University, where he died on December 21, 1924.

Hudayberdin is buried in Ufa in the park to them. V.I. Lenin.

== Legacy ==
- The Shagit Hudayberdin Governmental Prize has been awarded since 1989.
- Shagit Hudayberdin Museum. The museum was opened in 1976 in its native village, formerly called Piancino, in 1924 renamed Khudayberdino. Here are the documents, letters, photographs, things that belonged to Shagit Hudayberdin and his family; history of the village and the school.
- Baymak - Machine Building Plant in the name of Shagit Khudayberdin.
