= István Csukás =

Hungarian writer (1936–2020)

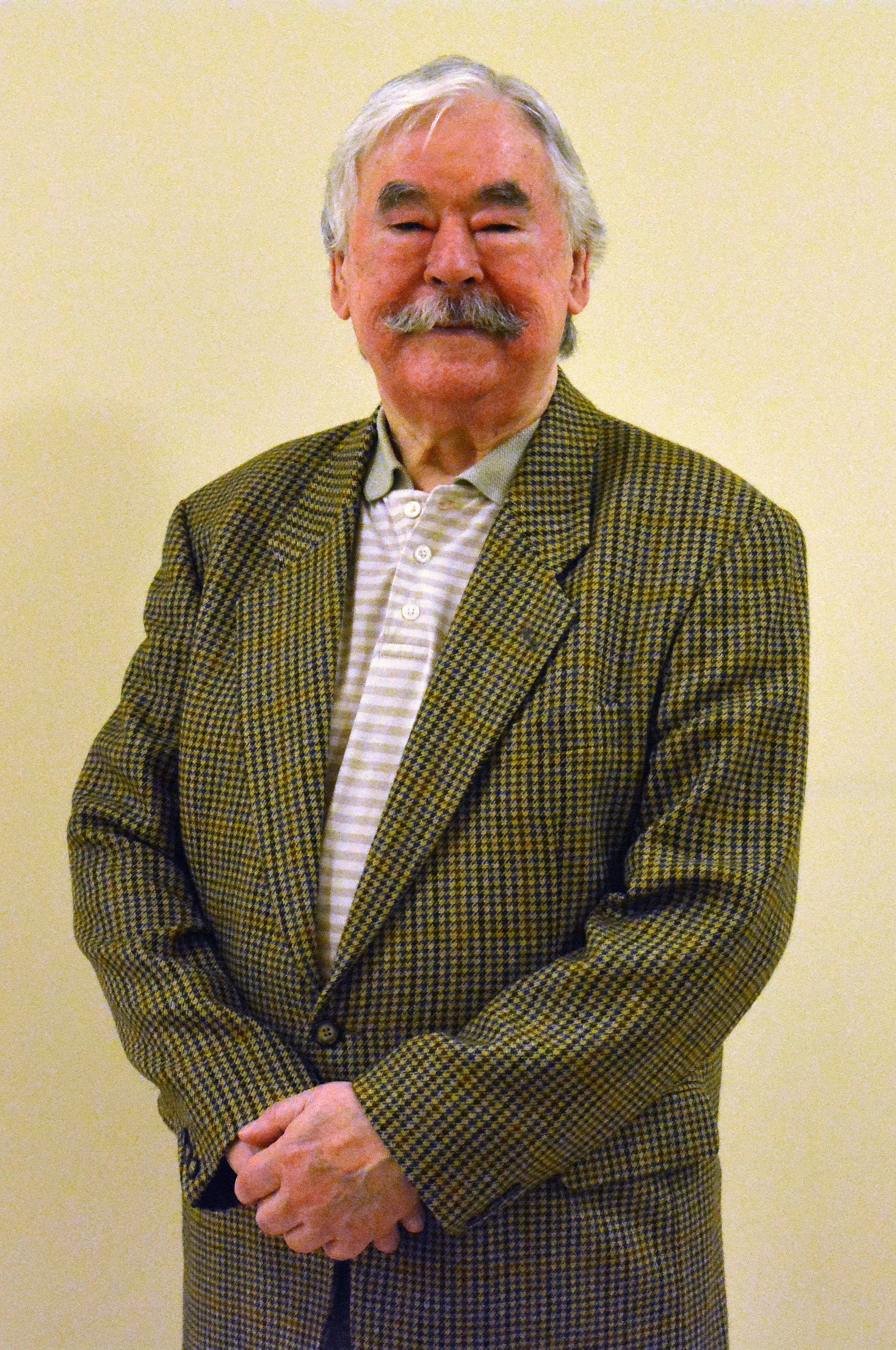
- Born: 2 April 1936; Kisújszállás, Kingdom of Hungary
- Died: 24 February 2020 (aged 83); Budapest, Hungary
- Occupations: Poet; Author

István Csukás (2 April 1936 – 24 February 2020) was a Hungarian poet and author of Jassic descent. He was awarded the Kossuth Prize in 1999, the most prestigious literary prize of Hungary.

== Awards ==
- Attila József Prize (1977 and 1978)
- Ifjúsági Prize (1978 and 1982)
- Literary prize of the Tekintet Foundation (1997)
- Kossuth Prize (1999)
- Prima Primissima Award (2011)

== Works ==
=== Poetry ===
- Elmondani adj erőt! (1962)
- Előszó a szerelemhez (1965)
- Koromcsillag (1968)
- Ima a vadevezősökért (1975)
- Egy kiscsacsi története (1975)
- A felidézett toronyszoba (1977)
- Az üres papír elégiája (1980)
- Mintha átvágnánk Tahitin (1982)
- Süsü újabb kalandjai (1983)
- Orr-beszámoló a Szépvölgyi út 67-től a Kolosy térig (1985)
- Mint az ejtőernyősök (1986)
- Metszet az Időből, Szárszó, nyár (1989)
- Étellift a pokolba (1995)
- Összegyűjtött versek (1996)
- Költők éhkoppon (1996)
- Sün Balázs (1997)
- Az én játékoskönyvem (1998)
- Csukás István nagy mesekönyve (2001)
- A házőrző macska (2002)
- A versíró kutya (2003)
- Ló az iskolában (2007)
- De szép az erdő (2007)
- Vidám állatkert (2007)
- Te mire gondolsz közben? (2008)

=== Novels ===
- Egy szürke kiscsacsi (1967)
- Mirr-Murr, a kandúr (1969)
- Pintyőke cirkusz, világszám! (1971)
- A téli tücsök meséi (1974)
- Hogyan fogtam el Settenkedő Tódort? (1978)
- Utazás a szempillám mögött (1978)
- Szegény Gombóc Artúr (1979)
- A radírpók (1979)
- Süsü, a sárkány (1980)
- Festéktüsszentő Hapci Benő (1980)
- Hogyan lettem filmszínész? (1981)
- A bátor Tintanyúl (1981)
- Madárvédő Golyókapkodó (1982)
- Civakodó cipőikrek (1983)
- Oriza-Triznyák (1984)
- Pom Pom főz (1985)
- A Nagy Ho-ho-ho-horgász (1985)
- Az óriástüdejű levegőfújó (1985)
- A legkisebb Ugrifüles (1985)
- Űrhajó az Orrbolygóról (1986)
- A mű-Süsü / A bűvös virág (1986)
- Süsü csapdába esik / Süsü és a Sárkánylány (1987)
- Lesből támadó ruhaszárítókötél (1987)
- Kelekótya kandúrok (1987)
- A Nagy Ho-ho-ho-horgászverseny (1987)
- Órarugógerincű Felpattanó (1987)
- Hapci-rakéta a Hókuszpókusz-szigetekre (1987)
- A magányos szamovár (1988)
- Vakkancs szétnéz Budapesten (1989)
- Tappancs (1989)
- Cillancs felfedezi a világot (1989)
- Brum Brum Brúnó (1989)
- A kelekótya kiskakas (1990)
- Kalandozás Betűországban (1990)
- Süsü, a sárkány (1993)
- Sün és barátai (1998)
- Mirr-Murr nyomoz Budapesten (1998)
- Süsüke, a sárkánygyerek (1998)
- Pom Pom összes meséi (1999)
- A Nagy Ho-ho-ho-horgász télen (1999)
- Süsüke újabb kalandjai (2000)
- Tükörbohócok (2002)
- Töf-töf elefánt (2004)
- Pom Pom újabb meséi (2005)
- Mirr-Murr, Oriza Triznyák és a többiek (2006)
- Aszpirin és Lucifer (2007)
- Ágacska (2008)
- A Nagy Ho-Ho-Ho-horgász kórházban (2009)
- A Nagy Ho-Ho-Ho-horgász nyáron (2010)
- Mi az adu? (2011)

=== Youth novels ===
- Keménykalap és krumpliorr (1973)
- Nyár a szigeten (1975)
- Vakáció a halott utcában (1976)
- Csicsóka és a moszkítók (1982)
- Berosált a rezesbanda (2013)

=== Theatre ===
- Ágacska (1981)
- Gyalogcsillag (1983)
- Kutyánszky Kázmér a versíró kutya (1988)
- Mesélj Münchhausen (1991)
- Bohóc az egész család (1994)

=== Film Scripts ===
- Mirr-Murr (1972)
- Kiscsacsi kalandjai (1972)
- A labda (1974)
- Le a cipővel! (1975)
- A legkisebb ugrifüles (1976–1977)
- Süsü, a sárkány kalandjai (1976–1984)
- Keménykalap és krumpliorr (1978)
- Vakáció a halott utcában (1979)
- Pom Pom meséi (1980–1982)
- A nagy ho-ho-ho-horgász (1982–1984)
- Sebaj Tóbiás (1983–1985)
- Kutyánszky Kázmér, a versíró kutya (1987)
- Csicsóka és a Moszkítók (1988)
- Mese a motorunkról (1989)
- Töf-töf elefánt (1991–1994)
- Süni és barátai (1995)
- Filléres irodalom (1996)
- Süsüke, a sárkánygyerek (2001)
- Nem hunyhat ki a láng (2009)
- Berosált a rezesbanda (2012)
