= Altaydyn cholmony =

Алтайдыҥ чолмоны
- Type: general broadsheet
- Founded: 1922
- Language: Altay
- Headquarters: ul. Choros-Gurkina, 38; Gorno-Altaysk
- Circulation: c. 3000
- Website: www.altai-republic.ru/modules.php?op=modload&name=Sections&file=index&req=viewarticle&artid=196&page=1

Altaydyn Cholmony (Altay: Алтайдыҥ чолмоны, CTA: Altaydıñ çolmonı, lit. Star of Altai) is the main Altai language newspaper of the Altai Republic. It is printed 3 times a week.

The newspaper received the Order of the Badge of Honour.

Previous designations:

- 1922-1923: Кызыл солун табыш (Red News)
- 1923-1925: Ойрот јери (Oirot region)
- 1925-1948: Кызыл Ойрот/Kьzьl Ojrot (Red Oirot)
