= Khudayberdino =

Khudayberdino Худайбердино
- Village
- Location within Bashkortostan Location within Russia
- Coordinates: 52°48′N 56°02′E
- Country: Russia
- Region: Bashkortostan
- District: Kugarchinsky District
- Time zone: UTC+5:00

Khudayberdino (Russian: Худайбердино; Bashkir: Хоҙайбирҙин, Xoźaybirźin) is a rural locality (a village) in Yalchinsky Selsoviet, Kugarchinsky District, Bashkortostan, Russia. The population was 378 as of 2010. There are 3 streets.

== Geography ==
Khudayberdino is located 44 km northwest of Mrakovo (the district's administrative centre) by road. Kovalyovka is the nearest rural locality.
