= Abazashta =

Abaza-language newspaper

Абазашта
- Type: general
- Format: broadsheet
- Owner(s): parliament and government of Karachay–Cherkessia
- Editor: F.K. Kulova
- Founded: 23 June 1938
- Language: Abaza
- Headquarters: pl. Kirova, 23; Cherkessk
- Circulation: 3850
- Website: http://abazashta.ru/

Abazashta (Abaza: Абазашта) is the only newspaper (and mass medium in general) published in the Abaza language in the Karachay–Cherkess Republic of the Russian Federation. It is published twice a week.

Abazin texts were originally published in the Cherkess language newspaper Черкес плъыж. On 23 July 1938, the Abazin newspaper Черкес плъыж was founded, later renamed to Коммунизм алашара (Light of Communism). It received its current designation in 1991.

Abaza culture day is celebrated annually on the anniversary of the founding of Abazashta, coinciding with the day of the state flag of Abkhazia.
