= Lezgi Gazet =

Лезги газет (Lezgi Gazet)
- Type: Weekly newspaper
- Format: A3 (Tabloid)
- Founder: Hajibey Hajibeyov
- Editor-in-chief: Агариза Саидов (Aragiza Saidov)
- Deputy editor: Шихмурад Шихмурадов (Shikhmurad Shikhmuradov)
- Founded: 21 July 1928
- Ceased publication: 1931
- Relaunched: 1943
- Language: Lezgin
- Headquarters: Makhachkala
- Country: Russia; (1991-current); Soviet Union; (1928-1991)
- Circulation: ~10,000 (2010)
- Website: www.lezgigazet.ru

Lezgi Gazet (Lezgian: Лезги газет, Russian: Лезгинская газета) is a Lezgin-language newspaper published in Dagestan, Russia, first established in the early days of the Soviet Union.

== History ==
The newspaper was established in 1928 with the name The New World (ЦIийи дуьнья) by Hajibey Hajibeyov (Lezgian: Гьажибег Гьажибегов, Russian: Гаджибек Гаджибеков), who that same year created the first official alphabet for Lezgin. (Previously Lezgin was written in Arabic script.) "The New World" was the first Lezgin-language publication using its own alphabet.

The newspaper changed names several times. The paper ceased publication in 1931, but in 1943 returned under the name Banner of Socialism (Социализмдин пайдах).

In 1951, the Soviet Union required all non-Russian newspapers to rely on the Communist Party of the Soviet Union's newspaper, Pravda, for their content. The Lezgi newspaper was renamed Dagestani Truth (Дагъустандин гьакъикъат), and almost all of its content consisted of translated articles published in the Russian-language Dagestani Truth (Дагестанская правда).

Agariza Saidov, editor of the Lezgi Gazet since 1994, said, "This decision was ill-conceived and erroneous, since it hindered the development of the culture, language and literature in native languages." In 1957, the Communist Party reversed its decision and the newspaper resumed publication of its own content under the name, Kommunist (Коммунист).

In 1978, the paper received the Order of the Badge of Honour from the Soviet government.

By 1973, it was published three times per week and had a circulation of 20,000.

For many years, the newspaper published the works of Shah Amir Muradov (1913—1996), called "the national poet of Dagestan," who also translated the works of Russian poets like Alexander Pushkin into the Lezgin language.

After the dissolution of the Soviet Union in 1991, the newspaper changed its name to Lezgi Gazet. Its circulation was approximately 4,000 in 1994.

== Current status ==
The newspaper reports focus on politics, economics, society, culture and sport. It also regularly features interviews and profiles related to Lezgin culture and history.

Lezgi Gazet is currently one of a few Lezgin-language publications serving the approximately 380,000 ethnic Lezgins in Dagestan. In 2010, the newspaper had 36 employees and a circulation of approximately 10,000.
