= Ossetian language =

Eastern Iranian language of Ossetia, in the Caucasus

Ossetian
- ирон ӕвзаг (iron ævzag) дигорон ӕвзаг (digoron ævzag)
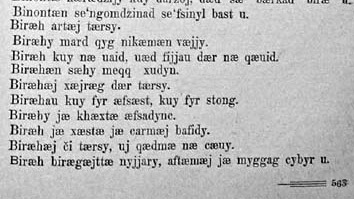
- Latin-script Ossetian text from a book published in 1935; part of an alphabetic list of proverbs.
- Pronunciation: [iˈron ɐvˈzäɡ] [digoˈron ʌvˈzäɡ]
- Native to: Ossetia
- Region: Caucasus
- Ethnicity: Ossetians
- Native speakers: 490,000 (2020 census)
- Language family: Indo-European: Indo-Iranian; Iranian; Northeastern; Scythian; Western; Alanic; Ossetian
- Standard forms: Ossetian; Standard Ossetian
- Dialects: Digor; Iron; Jassic (Note: Better considered as a distinct variety of Ossetic rather than a mere dialect of contemporary Ossetian.) †
- Writing system: Greek (First documented written records); Cyrillic (Ossetian alphabet); Georgian (c. 1938–1954); Latin (1923–1937)

Official status
- Official language in: Russia: North Ossetia–Alania; Georgia: Administration of South Ossetia; Partially recognised state: South Ossetia

Language codes
- ISO 639-1: os (for both Ossetian and the Iron dialect)
- ISO 639-2: oss (for both Ossetian and the Iron dialect)
- ISO 639-3: oss – inclusive code (for both Ossetian and the Iron dialect); Individual codes: osd – Digor Ossetian ysc – Jassic Ossetian
- Glottolog: osse1243
- Linguasphere: 58-ABB-a
- Ossetian is classified as Vulnerable by the UNESCO Atlas of the World's Languages in Danger

Alana speaking Ossetian Iron and Ossetian Digor

Ossetian (/ɒˈsɛtiən/ o-SET-ee-ən, /ɒˈsiːʃən/ o-SEE-shən, /oʊˈsiːʃən/ oh-SEE-shən), commonly referred to as Ossetic and rarely as Ossete, is an Eastern Iranic language that is spoken predominantly in Ossetia, a region situated on both sides of the Greater Caucasus, on the Russia-Georgia border. It is the native language of the Ossetian people, and a relative and possibly a descendant of the extinct Scythian, Sarmatian, and Alanic languages.

The northern half of the Ossetian region is part of Russia and is known as North Ossetia–Alania, while the southern half is part of the de facto country of South Ossetia (recognized by the United Nations as Russian-occupied territory that is de jure part of Georgia). Ossetian-speakers number about 614,350, with 451,000 recorded in Russia per the 2010 Russian census.

Despite Ossetian being the official languages of both North and South Ossetia, since 2009 UNESCO has listed Ossetian as "vulnerable".

== History and classification ==
Ethnolinguistic groups in the Caucasus region. Ossetian-speaking regions are shaded gold.

Ossetian is the spoken and literary language of the Ossetians, an Iranian ethnic group living in the central part of the Caucasus and constituting the basic population of North Ossetia–Alania, which is part of the Russian Federation, and of the de facto country of South Ossetia (recognized by the United Nations as de jure part of the Republic of Georgia). The Ossetian language belongs to the Iranian group of the Indo-European family of languages (as hinted by its endonym: ирон, irōn). Within Iranian, it is placed in the Eastern subgroup and further to a Northeastern sub-subgroup, but these are areal rather than genetic groups. The other Eastern Iranian languages, such as Pashto (spoken in Afghanistan and Pakistan) and Yaghnobi (spoken in Tajikistan), show certain commonalities, but also deep-reaching divergences from Ossetian.

From the 7th–8th centuries BCE, the languages of the Iranian group were distributed across a vast territory spanning present-day Iran (Persia), Central Asia, Eastern Europe, and the Caucasus. Ossetian is the sole survivor of the branch of Iranian languages known as Scythian. The Scythian group included numerous tribes, known in ancient sources as the Scythians, the Massagetae, the Saka, the Sarmatians, the Alans, and the Roxolani. The more easterly Khwarazm and Sogdians were also closely affiliated linguistically.

Ossetian, together with Kurdish, Tat, and Talysh, is one of the main Iranian languages with a sizable community of speakers in the Caucasus. As it is descended from Alanic, spoken by the medieval Alans, who emerged from the earlier Sarmatians, it is believed to be the only surviving descendant of a Sarmatian language. The closest genetically related language may be the Yaghnobi language of Tajikistan, the only other living Northeastern Iranian language. Ossetian has a plural formed by the suffix -ta, a feature it shares with Yaghnobi, Sarmatian and the now-extinct Sogdian; this is taken as evidence of a formerly wide-ranging Iranian-language dialect continuum on the Central Asian steppe. The names of ancient Iranian tribes (as transmitted through Ancient Greek) in fact reflect this pluralization, e.g. Saromatae (Σαρομάται) and Masagetae (Μασαγέται).

=== Evidence for Medieval Ossetian ===
Zelenchuk Inscription

The earliest known written sample of Ossetian is an inscription (the Zelenchuk Inscription) which dates back to the 10th–12th centuries and is named after the river near which it was found: the Bolshoy Zelenchuk River in Arkhyz, Russia. The text is written in the Greek alphabet, with special digraphs.

ΣΑΧΗΡΗ ΦΟΥΡΤ ΧΟΒΣ ΗΣΤΟΡΗ ΦΟΥΡΤ ΠΑΚΑΘΑΡ ΠΑΚΑΘΑΡΗ ΦΟΥΡΤ ΑΝΠΑΛΑΝ ΑΝΠΑΛΑΝΗ ΦΟΥΡΤ ΛΑΚ ΑΝΗ ΤΖΗΡΘΕ
Saxiri Furt Xovs Istori Furt Bӕqӕtar Bӕqӕtari Furt Æmbalan Æmbalani Furt Lak Ani čirtī
"K., son of S., son of I., son of B., son of A.; [this is] their monument."

(The original, following Zgusta, translates only initials; presumably this is because although the uninflected forms may be inferred, no written records of them have been found to date.)

The only other extant record of Proto-Ossetic are the two lines of "Alanic" phrases appearing in the Theogony of John Tzetzes, a 12th century Byzantine poet and grammarian:

Τοῖς ἀλανοῖς προσφθέγγομαι κατὰ τὴν τούτων γλῶσσαν
Καλὴ ἡμέρα σου αὐθέντα μου ἀρχόντισσα πόθεν εἶσαι
Ταπαγχὰς μέσφιλι χσινὰ κορθὶ κάντα καὶ τἄλλα
ἂν δ' ἔχῃ ἀλάνισσα παπᾶν φίλον: ἀκούσαις ταῦτα
οὐκ αἰσχύνεσαι αὐθέντρια μου νὰ γαμῇ τὸ μουνίν σου παπᾶς
τὸ φάρνετζ κίντζι μέσφιλι καὶτζ φουὰ σαοῦγγε

The portions in bold face above are Ossetian. Going beyond a direct transliteration of the Greek text, scholars have attempted a phonological reconstruction using the Greek as clues, thus, while τ (tau) would usually be given the value "t", it instead is "d", which is thought to be the way the early Ossetes would have pronounced it. The scholarly transliteration of the Alanic phrases is: "dӕ ban xʷӕrz, mӕ sfili, (ӕ)xsinjӕ kurθi kӕndӕ" and "du farnitz, kintzӕ mӕ sfili, kajci fӕ wa sawgin?"; equivalents in modern Ossetian would be "Dӕ bon xwarz, me'fšini 'xšinӕ, kurdigӕj dӕ?" and "(De') f(s)arm neč(ij), kinźi ӕfšini xӕcc(ӕ) (ku) fӕwwa sawgin". The passage translates as:

The Alans I greet in their language:
"Good day to you my lord's lady, where are you from?"
"Good day to you my lord's lady, where are you from?" and other things:
When an Alan woman takes a priest as a lover, you might hear this:
"Aren't you ashamed, my lordly lady, that you are having sex with a priest?" (Note: The original Ossetian expression is vulgar and thus has been paraphrased.)
"Aren't you ashamed, my lady, to have a love affair with the priest?"

Marginalia of Greek religious books, with some parts (such as headlines) of the book translated into Old Ossetic, have recently been found.

It is theorized that during the Proto-Ossetic phase, Ossetian underwent a process of phonological change conditioned by a Rhythmusgesetz or "Rhythm-law" whereby nouns were divided into two classes, those heavily or lightly stressed. "Heavy-stem" nouns possessed a "heavy" long vowel or diphthong, and were stressed on the first-occurring syllable of this type; "light-stem" nouns were stressed on their final syllable. This is precisely the situation observed in the earliest (though admittedly scanty) records of Ossetian presented above. This situation also obtains in Modern Ossetian, although the emphasis in Digor is also affected by the "openness" of the vowel. The trend is also found in a glossary of the Jassic dialect dating from 1422.

=== Usage ===
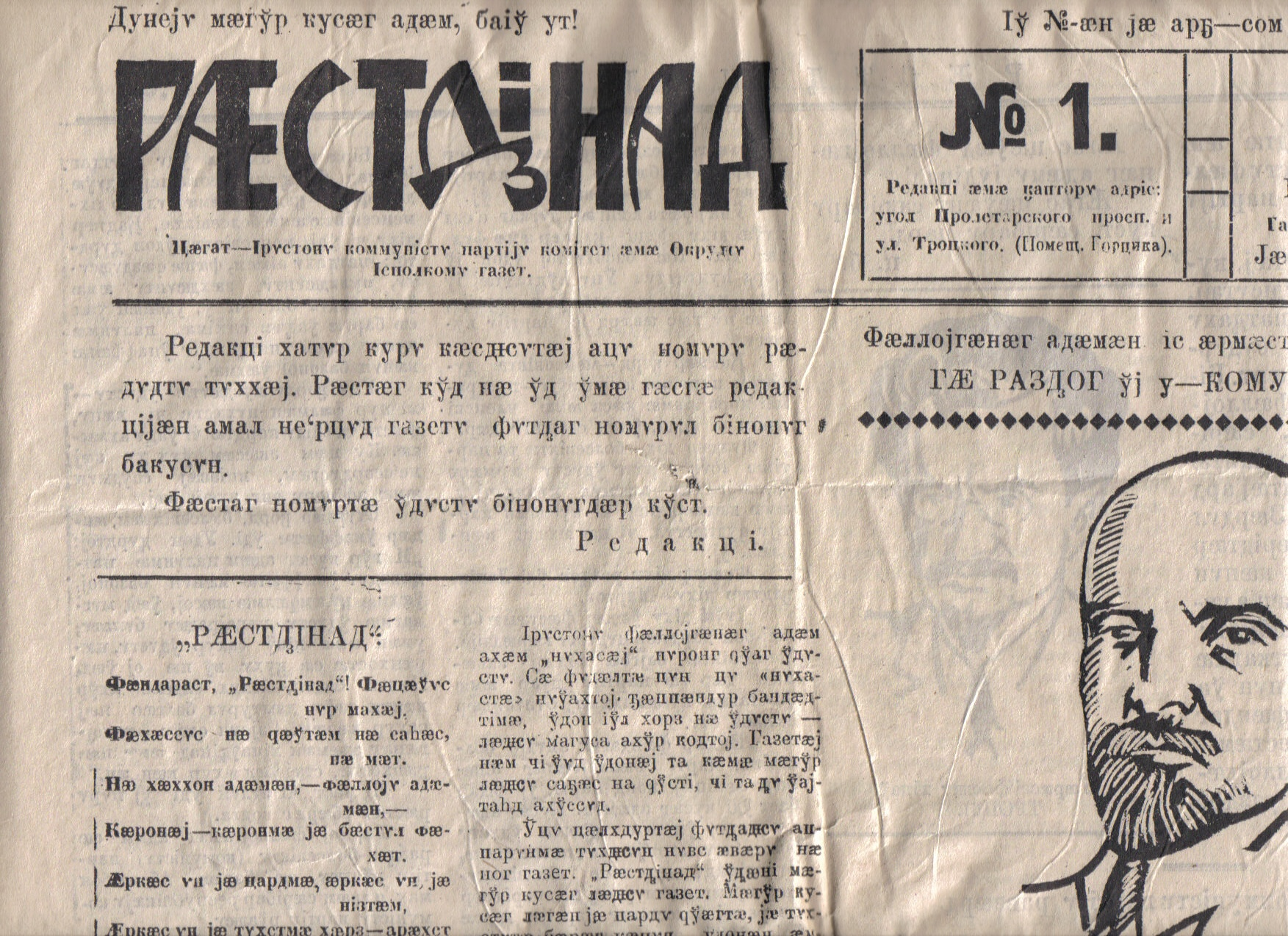
The first page of the first issue of the Ossetian newspaper Ræstdzinad in 1923, illustrating Sjögren's Cyrillic alphabet, including the letters ⟨ꚉ⟩ and ⟨ԫ⟩.

The first printed book in Ossetian was a short catechism published in Moscow in 1798. The first newspaper, Iron Gazet, appeared on July 23, 1906, in Vladikavkaz.

While Ossetian is the official language in both South and North Ossetia (along with Russian), its official use is limited to publishing new laws in Ossetian newspapers. There are two daily newspapers in Ossetian: Ræstdzinad (Рӕстдзинад / Рӕстꚉінад, "Truth") in the North and Xurzærin (Хурзӕрин, "The Sun") in the South. Some smaller newspapers, such as district newspapers, use Ossetian for some articles. There is a monthly magazine Max dug (Мах дуг, "Our era"), mostly devoted to contemporary Ossetian fiction and poetry.

Ossetian is taught in secondary schools for all pupils. Native Ossetian speakers also take courses in Ossetian literature.

The first modern translation of the Qur'an into Ossetian took place in 2007, initiated by an Ossetian, Robert Bolloev. The Jehovah's Witnesses and the Bible Society in Russia have each created translations of the Bible into Ossetian.

== Dialects ==
There are two important dialects: Digoron (distributed in the west of North Ossetia–Alania and Kabardino-Balkaria) which is considered more archaic and Iron (in the rest of the North Ossetia-Alania and in South Ossetia and Karachay-Cherkessia), spoken by one-sixth and five-sixths of the population, respectively. A third dialect of Ossetian, Jassic, was formerly spoken in Hungary.

== Phonology ==
=== Vowels ===
The Iron dialect of Ossetic has 7 vowels:

	Front	Central	Back
Close	и /i/		у /u/
Close-mid		ы /ɘ/	
Mid	е /e/		о /o/
Near-open		ӕ /ɐ/	
Open		а /a/	

The Digor dialect of Ossetic has 6 vowels:

	Front	Central	Back
Close	и /i/		у /u/
Mid	е /e/		о /o/
Near-open		ӕ /ʌ/	
Open		а /a/	

Vowel correspondence
Old Iranian	Iron dialect	Digor dialect
*a	ɐ, a (Note: Before a word-final consonant cluster.)	
*ā	a, ɐ (Note: Sometimes before j.), o (Note: Before a word-final nasal, or a word-final nasal-obstruent cluster.)	
*i	ɘ (Note: Note that ɘ < *i and ɘ < *u each caused palatalization and labialization on preceding velar consonant.)	i
*ī	ɘ	i
*u	ɘ	u
*ū	ɘ	u
*ai	i	e
*au	u	o
*ṛ	ɐr, ar (Note: Before a word-final consonant.)	

=== Consonants ===
The Ossetian researcher V. I. Abayev postulates 26 plain consonants for Ossetian, to which six labialized consonants and two semivowels may be added. Unusually for an Indo-European language, there is a series of glottalized (ejective) stops and affricates. This may constitute an areal feature of languages of the Caucasus.

		Labial	Dental/ alveolar		Postalveolar /palatal	Velar (Note: Despite the transcription used here, Abaev refers to /k/ and /ɡ/ as "postpalatal" rather than velar, and to /q/, /χ/ and /ʁ/ as velar rather than uvular.)		Uvular	
		Labial	plain	sibilant	Postalveolar /palatal	plain	labialized	plain	labialized
Stops/ Affricates	voiced	б /b/	д /d/	дз /d͡z/	дж /d͡ʒ/	г /ɡ/	гу /ɡʷ/		
Stops/ Affricates	voiceless	п /pʰ/ ~ /p/	т /tʰ/ ~ /t/	ц /t͡s/	ч /t͡ʃ/	к /kʰ/ ~ /k/	ку /kʷʰ/ ~ /kʷ/	хъ /q/	хъу /qʷ/
Stops/ Affricates	ejective	пъ /pʼ/	тъ /tʼ/	цъ /t͡sʼ/	чъ /t͡ʃʼ/	къ /kʼ/	къу /kʷʼ/		
Fricatives	voiced	в /v/		з /z/ ~ /ʒ/				гъ /ʁ/	гъу /ʁʷ/
Fricatives	voiceless	ф /f/		с /s/ ~ /ʃ/				х /χ/	ху /χʷ/
Nasals		м /m/	н /n/						
Approximants			л /ɫ/ ~ /l/		й /j/		у /w/		
Rhotic			р /r/						

Voiceless consonants become voiced word-medially (this is reflected in the orthography as well). /t͡ʃ/, /d͡ʒ/, and /t͡ʃʼ/ were originally allophones of /k/, /ɡ/, and /kʼ/ when followed by /e/, /i/ and /ɘ/; this alternation is still retained to a large extent.

Unlike all of its neighbouring languages, Ossetian largely lacks the original distinction of postalveolar /ʃ/ and /ʒ/ from the respective alveolar sibilants /s/ and /z/ (due to the early merger of Old Iranian *s/*š and *z/*ž). However, the northern variants use postalveolars, while the southern variants use the alveolars. In exchange, /ts/ and /dz/ in the north correspond into /ʃ/ and /ʒ/ (/tʃ/ and /dʒ/ after nasals or when geminated) in the south. Another pronunciation of дз /dz/ and ц /ts/ is said as /z/ and /s/.

=== Phrasal stress ===
Stress normally falls on the first syllable, unless it contains a central vowel (/ɘ/ or /ɐ/), in which case stress falls on the second syllable. Thus, су́дзаг/súdzag /ˈsud͡zag/ 'burning', but cӕнӕ́фсир/sænǽfsir /sɐˈnɐfsir/ 'grapes'. In addition, proper names are usually stressed on the second syllable regardless of their vowels, and recent Russian loanwords retain the stress they have in the source language.

In the Iron dialect, definiteness is expressed in words with stress on second syllable by shifting the stress to the initial syllable. This reflects the fact that historically they received a syllabic definite article (as they still do in the Digor dialect), and the addition of the syllable caused the stress to shift. The above patterns apply not just within the content word, rather to prosodic words, units that result from content words being joined into a single prosodic group with only one stress. Not only compound verbs, but also every noun phrase constitutes such a group containing only one stressed syllable, regardless of its length, for instance мӕ чи́ныг/mӕ čínyg /mɐˈt͡ʃinɘg/ 'my book', мӕгуы́р зӕро́нд лӕг/mægwýr zærónd læg /mɐˈgwɘr zɐˈrond lɐg/ 'a poor old man'. Since an initial particle and a conjunction are also included in the prosodic group, the single stress of the group may fall on them, too: фӕлӕ́ уый/fælǽ wyj 'but he'.

=== Morphophonemic alternations ===
1. In derivation or compounding, stems containing vowels /a o / <а o> change to the central vowel /ɐ/ <ӕ>, whereas those containing /i u/ < и/I у/u> may be replaced with /ɘ/:
  - авд/avd /avd/ 'seven' — ӕвдӕм/ævdæm /ɐvˈdɐm/ 'seventh'.
2. Sequences /ɐ/ + /i/ (ӕ + и/i), /ɐ/ + /ə/ (ӕ + ы/y), and /ɐ/ + /ɐ/ (ӕ + ӕ) assimilate, yielding the vowel /е/ <e>.
3. the palatalisation of the velars к (k) to ч (č), г (g) to дж (dž) and къ (kh) to чъ (čh) before the (currently or historically) front vowels, namely е (e), и (i) and ы (y), for instance карк (kark) 'hen' — карчы (karčy) 'hen (genitive)'.
4. the voicing of voiceless consonants in voiced environments: тых (tyx) 'strength' — ӕмдых (æmdyx) 'of equal strength'.
5. consonant gemination in certain grammatical forms, such as after the prefix ны (ny-) and before the suffixes -ag and -on.

== Writing system ==
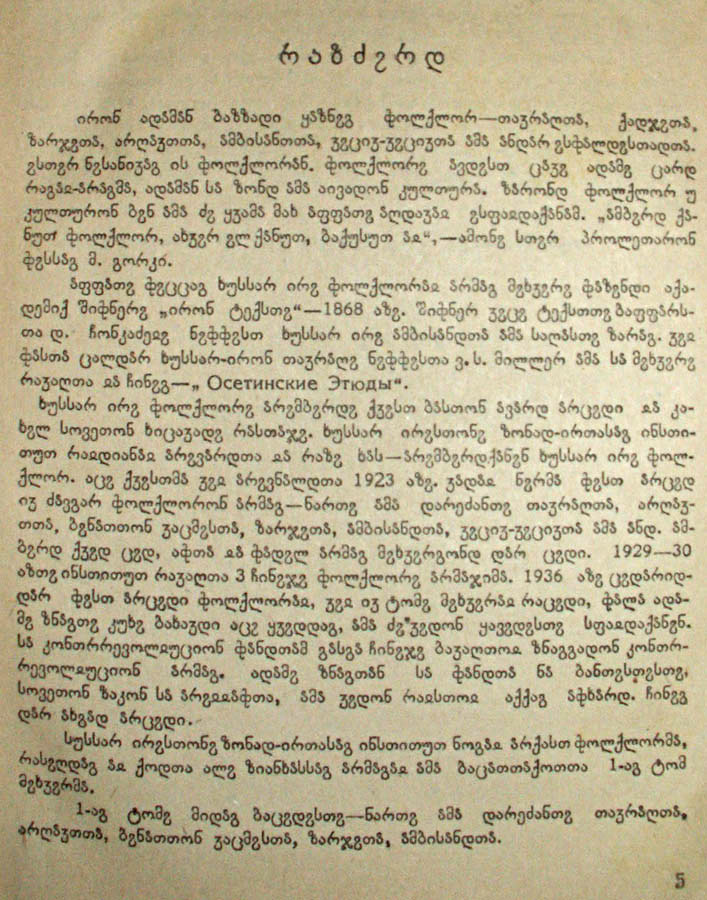
Ossetic text written with Georgian script, from a book on Ossetian folklore published in 1940 in South Ossetia

In 1888, an inscription in the Alanian language was found in Abkhazia, which dates back to the 4th century.

An Old Ossetic Greek script inscription of the 10th–12th centuries was found in Arkhyz, the oldest known attestation of the Ossetian language.

Written Ossetian may be immediately recognized by its use of the Cyrillic letter Æ (Ӕ ӕ), a letter to be found in no other language using Cyrillic script. The father of the modern Ossetian literary language is the national poet Kosta Khetagurov (1859–1906).

An Iron literary language was established in the 18th century, written using the Cyrillic script in Russia and the Georgian script in Georgia. The first Ossetian book was published in Cyrillic in 1798, and in 1844 the alphabet was revised by a Russian scientist of Finnish origin, Andreas Sjögren. In the early 1800s, Daniel Chonkadze produced a Russian-Ossetian dictionary and translated Ossetian folklore, paving the way to establishing the Ossetian literature.

A new alphabet based on the Latin script was made official in 1923, replacing the 1844 Sjögren alphabet, but in 1938 a revised Cyrillic alphabet was introduced, with digraphs replacing most diacritics of the 1844 alphabet.

In 1820, I. Yalguzidze published a Georgian-script alphabetic primer, adding three letters to the Georgian alphabet. The Georgian orthography receded in the 19th century, but was made official in the Georgian SSR's South Ossetian oblast in 1937 with the increased Georgian autonomy allowed by the dissolution of the Transcaucasian SFSR the previous year. As Latin script remained official in the north, this "one nation – two alphabets" issue caused discontent among South Ossetians in 1951, who demanded reunification of the script. In 1954, the Georgian script was replaced with the 1938 Cyrillic alphabet.

The table below shows the modern Cyrillic alphabet, used since 1938, with phonetic values for the Iron dialect in the IPA. Di- and tri-graphs in parentheses are not officially letters of the alphabet, but are listed here to represent phonemically distinctive sounds:

Modern Cyrillic alphabet
Letter	А	Ӕ (Note: The Ossetian Wikipedia uses Latin Æ/æ instead of Cyrillic ones.)	Б	В	Г	(Гу)	Гъ	(Гъу)	Д	Дж	Дз	Е	З	И	Й	К	(Ку)	Къ	(Къу)	Л
Letter	а	ӕ	б	в	г	(гу)	гъ	(гъу)	д	дж	дз	е	з	и	й	к	(ку)	къ	(къу)	л
IPA	ä	ɐ	b	v	ɡ	ɡʷ	ʁ	ʁʷ	d	d͡ʒ	z~d͡z	e	ʒ~z	i	j	k	kʷ	kʼ	kʼʷ	ɫ
Letter	М	Н	О	П	Пъ	Р	С	Т	Тъ	У	Ф	Х	(Ху)	Хъ	(Хъу)	Ц	Цъ	Ч	Чъ	Ы
Letter	м	н	о	п	пъ	р	с	т	тъ	у	ф	х	(ху)	хъ	(хъу)	ц	цъ	ч	чъ	ы
IPA	m	n	o	p	pʼ	r	ʃ~s	t	tʼ	u, w	f	χ	χʷ	q	qʷ	s~t͡s	t͡sʼ	t͡ʃ	t͡ʃʼ	ɘ

In addition, the letters ⟨ё⟩, ⟨ж⟩, ⟨ш⟩, ⟨щ⟩, ⟨ъ⟩, ⟨ь⟩, ⟨э⟩, ⟨ю⟩, and ⟨я⟩ are used to transcribe Russian loans.

The Latin alphabet (used 1923–1938)
Letter	A	Æ	B	C	Ch	Č	Čh	D	Dz	Dž	E	F	G	(Gu)	H	(Hu)	I	J	K	(Ku)
Letter	a	ӕ	b	c	ch	č	čh	d	dz	dž	e	f	g	(gu)	h	(hu)	i	j	k	(ku)
IPA	ä	ɐ	b	s~t͡s	t͡sʼ	t͡ʃ	t͡ʃʼ	d	z~d͡z	d͡ʒ	e	f	ɡ	ɡʷ	ʁ	ʁʷ	i	j	k	kʷ
Letter	Kh	(Khu)	L	M	N	O	P	Ph	Q	(Qu)	R	S	T	Th	U	V	X	(Xu)	Y	Z
Letter	kh	(khu)	l	m	n	o	p	ph	q	(qu)	r	s	t	th	u	v	x	(xu)	y	z
IPA	kʼ	kʷʼ	ɫ	m	n	o	p	pʼ	q	qʷ	r	ʃ~s	t	tʼ	u, w	v	χ	χʷ	ɘ	ʒ~z

In addition, the letters ⟨š⟩ and ⟨ž⟩ were used to transcribe Russian words. The "weak" vowels ⟨ӕ⟩ [ɐ] and ⟨ы⟩ [ɘ] are among the most common vowels in the language.

== Grammar ==
According to V. I. Abaev,

In the course of centuries-long propinquity to and intercourse with Caucasian languages, Ossetian became similar to them in some features, particularly in phonetics and lexicon. However, it retained its grammatical structure and basic lexical stock; its relationship with the Iranian family, despite considerable individual traits, does not arouse any doubt.

=== Nouns ===
Similar to Persian, Ossetic has lost the grammatical category of gender which many other Indo-European languages have preserved until today. According to the Encyclopӕdia Britannica 2006 Ossetian preserves many archaic features of Old Iranian, such as eight cases and verbal prefixes. It is debated how many of these cases are actually inherited from Indo-Iranian case morphemes and how many have re-developed, after the loss of the original case forms, through cliticization of adverbs or re-interpretations of derivational suffixes: the number of "inherited" cases according to different scholars ranges from as few as three (nominative, genitive and inessive) to as many as six (nominative, dative, ablative, directive, inessive). Some (the comitative, equative, and adessive) are secondary beyond any doubt.

==== Definiteness ====
Definiteness in the Iron dialect is, according to Abaev, only expressed by shift of word accent from the second to the first syllable (which is not possible in all nouns):

- færǽt "an axe"
- fǽræt "the axe"

Erschler reported in 2021 that he has been unable to replicate Abaev's observations of a distinction between definite and indefinite nouns in Iron.

==== Number ====
There is only one plural suffix for the nominal parts of speech, -т(ӕ) -t(ӕ), with the vowel ӕ ӕ occurring in the nominative case (see Cases below): e.g. сӕр sӕr 'head' – сӕртӕ sӕrtӕ 'heads'. Nevertheless, the complexity of the system is increased to some extent by the fact that this suffixation may be accompanied by a number of morphophonemic alternations. A svarabhakti vowel ы y is normally inserted after stems ending in a cluster (цӕст cӕst 'eye' – цӕстытӕ cӕstytӕ 'eyes'), but there are also numerous exceptions from this. This insertion of ы y regularly palatalises preceding velars to affricates in Iron: чызг čyzg 'girl' – чызджытӕ čyzdžytӕ 'girls'. In words ending in -ӕг ӕg, the vowel is usually elided in the plural, making the stem eligible for the above-mentioned svarabhakti insertion: барӕг barӕg 'rider' – барджытӕ bardžytӕ 'riders'. The same happens in words ending in -ыг -yg, but the consonant is also labialised there: мӕсыг mӕsyg 'tower' – мӕсгуытӕ mӕsgwytӕ 'towers'. The vowels а a and о o in closed syllables are weakened to ӕ ӕ before the suffix – фарс fars 'side' – фӕрстӕ fӕrstӕ 'sides'; this happens regularly in polysyllabic words, but with many exceptions in monosyllabic ones. Finally, the suffix consonant is geminated after sonorants: хӕдзар xӕdzar 'house' – хӕдзӕрттӕ xӕdzӕrttӕ 'houses'.

==== Cases ====
Nouns and adjectives share the same morphology and distinguish two numbers (singular and plural) and nine cases: nominative, genitive, dative, directive, ablative, inessive, adessive, equative, and comitative. The nominal morphology is agglutinative: the case suffixes and the number suffix are separate, the case suffixes are the same for both numbers and the number suffix is the same for all cases (illustrated here for the Iron dialect with the noun сӕр sӕr "head"):

	Singular	romanization	Plural	romanization
Nominative	сӕр	sӕr	сӕртӕ	sӕrtӕ
Genitive	сӕры	sӕry	сӕрты	sӕrty
Dative	сӕрӕн	sӕrӕn	сӕртӕн	sӕrtӕn
Allative	сӕрмӕ	sӕrmӕ	сӕртӕм	sӕrtӕm
Ablative	сӕрӕй	sӕrӕj	сӕртӕй	sӕrtӕj
Inessive	сӕры	sӕry	сӕрты	sӕrty
Adessive	сӕрыл	sӕryl	сӕртыл	sӕrtyl
Equative	сӕрау	sӕraw	сӕртау	sӕrtaw
Comitative	сӕримӕ	sӕrimӕ	сӕртимӕ	sӕrtimӕ

Since inessive and genitive show the same forms in both numbers, it is sometimes debated whether Ossetian might possess eight case forms for each number instead of nine. If the addition of the case suffix would result in hiatus, the consonant й j is usually inserted between them: зӕрдӕ-й-ӕн zærdæ-j-æn 'heart (dative)'.

==== Adjectives ====
There is no morphological distinction between adjectives and nouns in Ossetian. The suffix -дӕр -dær can express the meaning of a comparative degree: рӕсугъддӕр ræsuhddær 'more beautiful'. It, too, can be added to typical nouns: лӕг læg 'man' – лӕгдӕр lægdær 'more of a man, more manly'.

=== Pronouns ===
Pronoun stems
		nominative	oblique stem	enclitic genitive
1st person	singular	ӕз ӕz	мӕн- mӕn-	мӕ mӕ
1st person	plural	мах max		нӕ nӕ
2nd person	singular	ды dy	дӕу- dӕw-	дӕ dӕ
2nd person	plural	сымах / смах symax / smax		уӕ wӕ
3rd person	singular	уый wyj	уый- wyj-	йӕ, ӕй jӕ, ӕj
3rd person	plural	уыдон wydon		сӕ sӕ

The personal pronouns mostly take the same endings as the nouns. The 1st and 2nd person singular exhibit suppletion between the stem used in the nominative case and the stem used in the other (oblique) cases; the oblique stem without other endings is the genitive case form. The 1st and 2nd persons plural have only one stem each, functioning as both nominative and genitive. The third person pronoun coincides with the demonstrative 'that'. In addition, there are enclitic non-nominative forms of the pronouns of all three persons, which are somewhat deviant. Their genitive ends in -ӕ -ӕ; not only the inessive, but also the ablative coincides with the genitive; the allative ends in -м -m and the dative has the vowel -у- -y- before the ending (e.g. мын myn); and the comitative has the vowel -е- -e- (e.g. мемӕ memӕ). The 3rd singular stem has the doublet forms йV- jV- and ∅V- everywhere outside of the ablative and inessive, which appears as дзы dzy, and the comitative, which can only have йV- jV-.

Reflexive forms are constructed from the enclitic forms of the personal pronouns and the reflexive pronoun хӕдӕг xӕdӕg 'self' (with the oblique forms хиц- xic- in the dative and ablative, хиу- xiw- in the adessive and хи xi in the other cases).

There are two demonstratives – ай aj (stem а- a-, pl. адон adon) 'this' and wyj (stem уы- wy-, pl. уыдон wydon) 'that'. The interrogative pronouns are чи či (oblique stem кӕ- kӕ-) 'who' and сы cy (oblique stem сӕ- cӕ-). Indefinite pronouns meaning any- and some- are formed from the interrogatives by means of the prefix ис- is- and the suffix -дӕр -dӕr, respectively. Negatives are formed similarly, but with the prefix ни- ni-; the totality prefix ('every-') is ал- al-, and ӕлы ӕly is used adjectivally. Other pronouns meaning 'all' are ӕгас ӕgas and ӕппӕт ӕppӕt. There are two pronouns meaning 'other': иннӕ innӕ for 'another of two, a definite other one' and ӕндӕр ӕndӕr for 'some other, an indefinite other one'.

=== Verbs ===
Verbs distinguish six persons (1st, 2nd and 3rd, singular and plural), three tenses (present, past and future, all expressed synthetically), three moods (indicative, subjunctive, imperative), and belong to one of two grammatical aspects (perfective and imperfective). The person, tense and mood morphemes are mostly fused. The following description is of Iron.

==== Stems ====
Each verb has a present stem and a past stem (similar in practice to Persian), the latter normally being identical to the past participle. The past stem commonly differs from the present stem by adding т t or д d (e.g. дар- dar- : дард- dard- 'to hold'; уарз- warz : уарзт warzt 'to love'), or, more rarely, -ст -st (e.g. бар- bar : барст- barst 'weigh') or -ыд yd (зар- zar- : зарыд- zaryd- 'sing'; nonetheless, the past participle of this type is still formed with -д/т t/d: зард- zard-). However, there are usually various other vowel and consonant changes as well. Some of the most common vowel alternations are ӕ ӕ : а a (e.g. кӕс- kӕs : каст- kast- 'look'), и i : ы y (e.g. риз- riz- : рызт- ryzt- 'tremble'), and у u : ы y (e.g. дзур- dzur- : дзырд- dzyrd- 'speak'); some other alternations are a a : ӕ ӕ (mostly in bisyllabic stems, e.g. араз- araz- : арӕз- arӕz- 'make'), ау aw : ы y, ӕу ӕw : ы y, and о o : ы y. Frequent consonant changes are -д d, -т t, -тт tt, -нд nd, -нт nt > -ст st (e.g. кӕрд- kӕrd- : карст karst 'cut'), -дз dz, -ц -c, -ндз -ndz, -нц -nc > -гъд hd (лидз- lidz- : лыгъд- lyhd- 'run away'), elision of a final н n or м m (e.g. нӕм nӕm : над nad). Suppletion is found in the stem pair дӕттын dӕttyn : лӕвӕрд lӕvӕrd 'give'. It is also seen in the copula, whose past stem is уыд- wyd-, whereas the present forms are highly irregular and begin in д- d-, ст- st- оr in a vowel (see below).

There are also many related transitive-intransitive verb pairs, which also differ by means of a vowel alternation (commonly а a : ӕ ӕ, e.g. сафын safyn 'lose' : сӕфын sӕfyn 'be lost', and у u : уы wy, e.g. хъусын qusyn 'hear' : хъуысын qʷysyn 'be heard') and sometimes by the addition of the consonant -с s (тавын tavyn 'to warm' : тафсын tæfsyn 'to be warm').

==== Tense and mood conjugation ====
The present and future tense forms use the present stem.

The indicative present endings are as follows:

	singular	plural
1st person	-ын -yn	-ӕм -ӕm
2nd person	-ыс -ys	-ут -ut
3rd person	-ы -y	-ынц -ync

Only the copula wyn 'be' is conjugated differently:

	singular	plural
1st person	дӕн dӕn	стӕм stӕm
2nd person	дӕ dӕ	стут stut
3rd person	-и(с) i(s), -у u	сты sty

The copula also has a special iterative stem вӕйй- vӕjj-, which is conjugated regularly.

The future tense forms consist of the present stem, the element -дзы(н)- ~ -дзӕн- -dzy(n)- ~ -dzæn- (originally a separate root meaning 'wish' according to Fredrik Thordarson) and endings which appear to derive from encliticised copula уын uyn 'be' (see above table) used as an auxiliary. Thus, the resulting composite endings are:

	singular	plural
1st person	-дзын-ӕн -dzyn-ӕn	-дзы-стӕм -dzy-stӕm
2nd person	-дзын-ӕ -dzyn-ӕ	-дзы-стут -dzy-stut
3rd person	-дзӕн-(ис) -dzӕn-(is)	-дзы-сты -dzy-sty

The past tense uses the past stem. The endings, however, are different for intransitive and transitive verbs. The intransitive endings are:

	singular	plural
1st person	-(т)ӕн -(t)ӕn	-ыстӕм -ystӕm
2nd person	-(т)ӕ -(t)ӕ	-ыстут -ystut
3rd person	-(и(с)) -(i(s))	-ысты -ysty

The construction appears to be, in origin, a periphrastic combination of the past passive participle and the copula; that is why the endings are similar to the ones added to -дзы(н)- -dzy(n)- in the future tense.

The transitive endings, on the other hand, are:

	singular	plural
1st person	-(т)он -(t)on	-(т)ам -(t)am
2nd person	-(т)ай -(t)aj	-(т)ат -(t)at
3rd person	-а -a	-(т)ой -(t)oj

Remarkably, these forms actually derive from the old past subjunctive rather than the indicative (which is why the endings still almost entirely coincide with those of the future subjunctive, apart from the initial consonant т t). The variable -т- -t of the transitive as well as the intransitive past endings appear in verbs whose present stem ends in vowels and sonorants (й j, у u, р r, л l, м m, н n), since only these consonants are phonotactically compatible with a following sequence -дт- dt, which would normally arise from the combinations of the dentals of the stem and the ending: e.g. кал-д-т-он kal-d-t-on 'I poured', but саф-т-он saf-t-on 'I lost'.

The subjunctive mood has its own forms for each tense. The endings are as follows:

	present-future		past		future	
	singular	plural	singular	plural	singular	plural
1st person	-ин -in	-иккам -ikkam	-аин -ain	-аиккам -aikkam	-он -on	-ӕм -ӕm
2nd person	-ис -is	-иккат -ikkat	-аис -ais	-аиккат -aikkat	-ай -aj	-ат -at
3rd person	-ид -id	-иккой -ikkoj	-аид -aid	аиккой -aikkoj	-а -a	-ой -oj

In addition, a т t is added before the ending in transitive verbs. The future forms derive from the historical subjunctive and the others from the historical optative. In spite of some nuances and tendencies reflecting from their historical functions, there is a lot of overlap between the uses of the 'present-future' and the 'future' subjunctive (desire, possibility etc.), but a clear contrast between the two is found in conditional clauses, where the former expresses unreal conditions and the latter – real ones.

The imperative consists of the present stem and the following endings:

	singular	plural
2nd person	-∅	-ут -ut
3rd person	-ӕд -ӕd	-ӕнт -ӕnt

A special future imperative form can be formed by the addition of the independent particle иу iw.

==== Voice ====
Passive voice is expressed periphrastically with the past passive participle and an auxiliary verb цӕуын cӕwyn 'to go': аразын arazyn 'build' – арӕзт цӕуын arӕzt cӕwyn 'be built'; causative meaning is also expressed periphrastically by combining the infinitive and the verb кӕнын kӕnyn 'to do': e.g. бадын badyn 'to sit' – бадын кӕнын badyn kænyn 'to seat'. Reflexive meaning is expressed by adding the reflexive pronoun хи xi: дасын dasyn 'to shave (something, somebody)' – хи дасын xi dasyn 'shave oneself'.

==== Aspect ====
Somewhat similarly to the Slavic languages, verbs belong to one of two lexical aspects: perfective vs. imperfective, and the aspects are most commonly expressed by prefixes of prepositional origin, which simultaneously express direction or other abstract meanings: цӕуын cӕwyn 'go (imperf.)' – рацӕуын racӕwyn 'go out (perf.). The directional prefixes simultaneously express ventive or andative direction:

	'out'	'in'	'down'	'up'	neutral
away from the speaker	а- a-	ба- ba- 'in'	ны- ny-	с- s-	фӕ- fӕ-
towards the speaker	ра- ra-	ӕрба- ӕrba-	ӕр- ӕr-	с- s-	NA

In addition, these prefixes may express small aspectual nuances: а- a- is used for rapid, brief and superficial motion, арба- arba- also for rapid and sudden action, ба- ba- for more substantial action, ны- ny- for especially intensive action, while фӕ- fӕ- can express habituality in the present and either repetition or rapidity and brevity in the past. A morphophonological peculiarity of the prefixes is that when they are added to roots beginning in the vowel а a, as well as to the copula's form ис is, the consonant ц c is epenthesised: фӕ-ц-ис fӕ-c-is 'became (3rd person)'. The prefix ны ny also causes gemination of the following consonant: кӕлын kӕlyn 'pour' – ныккӕлын nykkӕlyn 'spill'.

Iterativity or habituality may be expressed with the separate particle иу iw. To make a prefixed form receive imperfective meaning, the article цӕй cӕj is inserted: рацӕйцыди racӕjcydi 'he was going out'.

==== Non-finite verb forms ====
There is an infinitive, four participles (present and past active, past passive, and future), and a gerund.

	past	present	future
active	-ӕг -ӕg		-инаг -inag
passive	-т t / -д d	(-ӕн -ӕn)	-инаг -inag
gerund	-гӕ -gӕ		
infinitive	-ын -yn		

The infinitive is formed from the present stem with the ending -ын -yn, which phonologically coincides with the 1st person singular: цӕуын cӕwyn 'to go' (and 'I go').

The past passive participle in -т t or -д d coincides with the past stem (фыссын fyssyn 'write' – фыст fyst 'written'); it is often nominalised to a verbal noun. All the other participles, as well as the gerund, are formed from the present stem. The future participle in -инаг -inag may have either active or passive meaning: фыссинаг fyssinag 'who will write / will be written'. Together with the copula used as an auxiliary, it forms a periphrastic immediate future tense. The dedicated active participles in -ӕг -ӕg and receive 'present' or 'past', or more accurately, imperfective or perfective meaning depending on the aspect of the stem: фыссӕг fyssӕg 'writing' – ныффыссӕг nyffyssæg 'having written'. The participle-gerund form ending in -гӕ -gӕ (бадгӕ badgӕ '(while) sitting'), can be used adverbially, as a gerund, but also attributively like a participle with absolutive voice: кӕрдгӕ kӕrdgӕ may mean '(which has been) cut', судзгӕ sudzgӕ may mean '(which is) burning', etc. To receive an unambiguously adverbial, i.e. gerundial interpretation, it needs to be declined in the ablative case, as does an adjective: бадгӕйӕ badgӕjӕ '(while) sitting'. There are also verbal nouns: one derived from the present stem with the suffix -ӕн -ӕn with the meaning 'fit to be X-ed' – e.g. зын ссарӕн zyn ssarӕn 'hard to find' – and one in -аг -ag denoting permanent quality – e.g. нуазаг nwazag 'drunkard'.

== Syntax ==
Ossetic uses mostly postpositions (derived from nouns), although two prepositions exist in the language. Noun modifiers precede nouns. The word order is not rigid, but tends towards SOV. Wackernagel's law applies. The morphosyntactic alignment is nominative–accusative, although there is no accusative case: rather, the direct object is in the nominative (typically if inanimate or indefinite) or in the genitive (typically if animate or definite).

== Numerals ==
For numerals above 20, two systems are in use – a decimal one used officially, and a vigesimal one used colloquially. The vigesimal system was predominant in traditional usage. The decimal one is said to have been used in pre-modern times by shepherds who had borrowed it from the Balkars, but it came into more general use only after its introduction in Ossetian schools in 1925 to facilitate the teaching of arithmetic. For example, 40 is цыппор cyppor (from цыппар cyppar 'four') and 60 is ӕхсӕй æxsaj (from ӕхсӕз æxsæz 'six') in the decimal system, whereas the vigesimal designations are дыууиссӕдзы dywwissædzy (from дыууӕ dywwæ 'two' and ссӕдз ssædz 'twenty') and ӕртиссӕдзы ærtissædzy (from ӕртӕ ærtæ 'three' and ссӕдз ssædz 'twenty'). In the same way, the inherited decimal сӕдӕ sædæ 'one hundred' has the vigesimal equivalent фондзыссӕдзы fondzyssædzy ('5 times twenty'). An additional difference is that the decimal system places tens before units (35 is ӕртын фондз ærtyn fondz '30 + 5'), whereas the vigesimal uses the opposite order (35 is фынддӕс ӕмӕ сӕндз fynddæs æmæ ssædz '15 + 20'). Ordinal numbers are formed with the suffix -ӕм -æm, or, for the first three numbers, -аг -ag.

Ossetic numerals
	one	two	three	four	five	six	seven	eight	nine	ten
Ossetian	иу iw	дыууӕ dywwæ	ӕртӕ ærtæ	цыппар cyppar	фондз fondz	ӕхсӕз æxsæz	авд avd	аст ast	фараст farast	дӕс dæs
	eleven	twelve	thirteen	fourteen	fifteen	sixteen	seventeen	eighteen	nineteen	twenty
Ossetian	иуæндæс iwændæs	дыууадæс dywwadæs	æртындæс ærtyndæs	цыппæрдæс cyppærdæs	фынддӕс fynddæs	æхсæрдæс æxsærdæs	æвддæс ævddæs	æстдæс æstdæs	нудæс nudæs	ссӕдз ssædz

number	new (decimal) system			old (vigesimal) system		
number	Cyrillic	Romanisation	Logic	Cyrillic	Romanisation	Logic
21	ссӕдз иу	ssædz iw	20 + 1	иу ӕмӕ ссӕдз	iw æmæ ssædz	1 + 20
30	ӕртын	ærtyn	3 × 10	дӕс ӕмӕ ссӕдз	dæs æmæ ssædz	10 + 20
35	ӕртын фондз	ærtyn fondz	30 + 5	фынддӕс ӕмӕ сӕндз	fynddæs æmæ ssædz	15 + 20
40	цыппор	cyppor	4 × 10	дыууиссӕдзы	dywwissædzy	2 × 20
50	фæндзай	fændzaj	5 × 10	дӕс ӕмӕ дыууиссӕдзы	dæs æmæ dywwissædzy	10 + 2 × 20
60	ӕхсӕй	æxsaj	6 × 10	ӕртиссӕдзы	ærtissædzy	3 × 20
70	æвдай	ævdaj	7 × 10	дӕс ӕмӕ ӕртиссӕдзы	dæs æmæ ærtissædzy	10 + 3 × 20
80	æстай	æstaj	8 × 10	цыппарыссæдзы	cypparyssædzy	4 × 20
90	нæуæдз	næwædz	9 × 10	дӕс ӕмӕ ӕртиссӕдзы	dæs æmæ ærtissædzy	10 + 4 × 20
100	сӕдӕ	sædæ	–	фондзыссӕдзы	fondzyssædzy	5 × 20
120	сӕдӕ ссӕдз	sædæ ssædz	100 + 20	ӕхсӕзыссӕдзы	æxsæzyssædzy	6 × 20
140	сӕдӕ цыппор	sædæ cyppor	100 + 40	авдыссӕдзы	avdyssædzy	7 × 20
160	сӕдӕ ӕхсӕй	sædæ æxsaj	100 + 60	астыссӕдзы	æstyssædzy	8 × 20
180	сӕдӕ æстай	sædæ æstaj	100 + 80	фарастыссӕдзы	farastyssædzy	9 × 20
200	дыууӕ сӕдӕ	dywwæ sædæ	2 × 100	дыууӕ фондзыссӕдзы	dywwӕ fondzyssædzy	2 × 5 × 20
200	дыууӕ сӕдӕ	dywwæ sædæ	2 × 100	дӕсыссӕдзы	dæsyssædzy	10 × 20
220	дыууӕ сӕдӕ ссӕдз	dywwæ sædæ ssædz	2 × 100 + 20	дыууӕ фондзыссӕдзы ӕмӕ ссӕдз	dywwӕ fondzyssædzy ӕmӕ ssӕdz	2 × 5 × 20 + 20
220	дыууӕ сӕдӕ ссӕдз	dywwæ sædæ ssædz	2 × 100 + 20	иуæндæсыссӕдзы	iwændæsyssædzy	11 × 20

- 1000 мин min, ӕрзӕ ærzæ
- 1100 мин сӕдӕ min sædæ ('1000 + 100'), иуæндæс фондзыссӕдзы iwændæs fondzyssædzy ('11 × 100')
- 2000 дыууӕ мины dywwæ miny ('2 × 1000')
- 1 000 000 милуан milwan

== Sample text ==
Cyrillic text	Cyrillic text (Sjögren alphabet 1844)	Romanisation	Translation
Нартӕн уӕд сӕ хистӕр Уӕрхӕг уыдис.	Нартӕн ўӕд сӕ хістӕр Ўӕрхӕг ўѵдіс.	Nartæn wæd sæ xistær Wærxæg wydis.	At that time, the most senior of the Narts was Warkhag.
Уӕрхӕгӕн райгуырдис дыууӕ лӕппуйы, фаззӕттӕ.	Ўӕрхӕгӕн рајгўѵрдіс дѵўўӕ лӕппујѵ, фаззӕттӕ.	Wærxægæn rajgwyrdis dywwæ læppujy, fazzættæ.	Two boys were born to Warkhag, twins.
Иу дзы райгуырдис фыццаг кӕркуасӕны, иннӕ та райгуырдис дыккаг кӕркуасӕны, Бонвӕрноны скастмӕ.	Іў ꚉѵ рајгўѵрдіс фѵццаг кӕркўасӕнѵ, іннӕ та рајгўѵрдіс дѵккаг кӕркўасӕнѵ, Бонвӕрнонѵ скастмӕ.	Iw dzy rajgwyrdis fyccag kærkwasæny, innæ ta rajgwyrdis dykkag kærkwasæny, Bonværnony skastmæ.	One of them was born at the first crowing of the rooster, and the other was born at the second crowing of the rooster, before the rising of Bonvarnon (the Morning Star).
Рухс хуры тынтӕ ныккастис Уӕрхӕгмӕ, базыдта, хъӕбул куыд адджын у, уый.	Рухс хурѵ тѵнтӕ нѵккастіс Ўӕрхӕгмӕ, базѵдта, ԛӕбул кўѵд адԫѵн у, ўѵј.	Ruxs xury tyntæ nykkastis Wærxægmæ, bazydta, qæbul kwyd addžyn u, wyj.	The bright rays of the sun glanced down at Warkhag – he knew how dear the child was to him.
Уӕрхӕг йӕ лӕппуты райгуырды боны фарнӕн скодта нӕртон куывд сырды фыдӕй.	Ўӕрхӕг јӕ лӕппутѵ рајгўѵрдѵ бонѵ фарнӕн скодта нӕртон кўѵвд сѵрдѵ фѵдӕј.	Wærxæg jæ læpputy rajgwyrdy bony farnæn skodta nærton kwyvd syrdy fydæj.	To (bring) good fortune for the day of his boys' birth, Warkhag made a Nartic feast of game meat.
Ӕрхуыдта уӕларвӕй Куырдалӕгоны, фурдӕй — Донбеттыры, Нартӕй та — Борӕйы ӕмӕ ӕндӕрты.	Ӕрхўѵдта ўӕларвӕј Кўѵрдалӕгонѵ, фурдӕј — Донбеттѵрѵ, Нартӕј та — Борӕјѵ ӕмӕ ӕндӕртѵ.	Ærxwydta wælarvæj Kwyrdalægony, furdæj — Donbettyry, Nartæj ta — Boræjy æmæ ændærty.	From the sky he invited Kurdalagon (the smith god), from the sea – Donbettyr (the sea god), and of the Narts – Bora and others.
Уӕрхӕджы уарзон лӕппутыл буц нӕмттӕ сӕвӕрдта уӕларв Куырдалӕгон: хистӕрыл — Æхсар, кӕстӕрыл — Æхсæртæг.	Ўӕрхӕԫѵ ўарзон лӕппутѵл буц нӕмттӕ сӕвӕрдта ўӕларв Кўѵрдалӕгон: хістӕрѵл — Æхсар, кӕстӕрѵл — Æхсæртæг.	Wærxædžy warzon læpputyl buc næmttæ sæværdta wælarv Kwyrdalægon: xistæryl — Æxsar, kæstæryl — Æxsærtæg.	Celestial Kurdalagon bestowed special names on Warkhag's beloved boys: on the elder one – Akhsar, and on the younger one – Akhsartag.
Номӕвӕрӕджы лӕварӕн Куырдалӕгон радта Уӕрхӕгӕн удӕвдз йӕ куырдадзы фӕтыгӕй, болат ӕндонӕй арӕзт.	Номӕвӕрӕԫѵ лӕварӕн Кўѵрдалӕгон радта Ўӕрхӕгӕн удӕвꚉ јӕ кўѵрдаꚉѵ фӕтѵгӕј, болат ӕндонӕј арӕзт.	Nomæværædžy lævaræn Kwyrdalægon radta Wærxægæn udævdz jæ kwyrdadzy fætygæj, bolat ændonæj aræzt.	As a godfather's ('name-giver's') present, Kurdalagon gave Warkhag a magic flute (udævdz) made of fætyg, the bulat steel of his forge.
Удӕвдзы Нарт сӕвӕрдтой сӕ фынгыл, ӕмӕ сын кодта диссаджы зарӕг уадындз хъӕлӕсӕй:	Удӕвꚉѵ Нарт сӕвӕрдтој сӕ фѵнгѵл, ӕмӕ сѵн кодта діссаԫѵ зарӕг ўадѵнꚉ qӕлӕсӕј:	Udævdzy Nart sæværdtoj sæ fyngyl, æmæ syn kodta dissadžy zaræg wadyndz qælæsæj:	The Narts put the magic flute on their table, and it sang to them a marvellous song with the voice of a flute:
«Айс ӕй, аназ ӕй Хуыцауы хӕларӕй, Айс ӕй, аназ ӕй — ронджы нуазӕн!»	«Ајс ӕј, аназ ӕј Хўѵцаўѵ хӕларӕј, Ајс ӕј, аназ ӕј — ронԫѵ нўазӕн!»	«Ajs æj, anaz æj Xwycawy xælaræj, Ajs æj, anaz æj — rondžy nwazæn!»	'Take it, drink it to Khutsaw's (the supreme deity's) health, take it, drink it – the cup of rong (magical drink)!'

== See also ==
- Jász people

== Bibliography ==
- Abaev, V. I. 1964. A grammatical sketch of Ossetic (Russian version)
- Abaev, V. I. Ossetian Language and Folklore, USSR Academy of Sciences, Moscow-Leningrad, 1949
- Arys-Djanaieva, Lora. Parlons Ossète. Paris: L'Harmattan, 2004, ISBN 2-7475-6235-2.
- Dalby, Andrew (1998). Dictionary of Languages: The Definitive Reference to More Than 400 Languages. Columbia University Press. ISBN 978-0-231-11568-1.
- Erschler, David (2018). Ossetic. Geoffrey Haig and Geoffrey Khan (eds.), The Languages and Linguistics of Western Asia: Berlin: DeGruyter Mouton. pp. 851–881.
- Foltz, Richard (2022). The Ossetes: Modern-Day Scythians of the Caucasus. London: Bloomsbury. ISBN 978-0-7556-1845-3.
- "Ossetian". Oxford English Dictionary (online ed.). Oxford University Press. (Subscription or participating institution membership required.)
- Ivanov, Sergey A.; Lubotsky, Alexandr (2010). "An Alanic Marginal Note and the Exact Date of John II's Battle with the Pechenegs". Byzantinische Zeitschrift. 103 (2): 595–603. doi:10.1515/byzs.2010.017. hdl:1887/18310. S2CID 162785119.
- Nasidze, Ivan; Quinque, Dominique; Dupanloup, Isabelle; Rychkov, Sergey; Naumova, Oksana; Zhukova, Olga; Stoneking, Mark (2004). "Genetic Evidence Concerning the Origins of South and North Ossetians". Annals of Human Genetics. 68 (6): 588–599. doi:10.1046/j.1529-8817.2004.00131.x. PMID 15598217. S2CID 1717933.
- Testen, David (1997). Ossetic Phonology. Alan S. Kaye and Peter T. Daniels (eds.), Phonologies of Asia and Africa: Winona Lake: Winona Lake, Indiana: Eisenbrauns. pp. 707–732.
- Thordarson, Fridrik. Ossetic. In Rüdiger Schmitt (ed.), Compendium Linguarum Iranicarum, 456-479. Wiesbaden: Dr. Ludwig Reichert.
- Windfuhr, Gernot (2013). The Iranian Languages. Routledge. ISBN 978-1-135-79703-4.
- Zgusta, Ladislav (1987). The Old Ossetic Inscription from the River Zelencuk. [Illustr.] – Wien: Verl. D. Österr. Akad. D. Wiss. 1987. 68 S., 1 Bl. Kt. Gr. 8° (Veröffentlichungen D. Iranischen Kommission. 21.) (Österr. Akad. D. Wiss., Phil. -hist. Kl. Sitzungsberichte. 486.). Austrian Academy of Sciences Press. ISBN 978-3-7001-0994-5.
