= Bashkortostan (newspaper) =

Bashkir-language newspaper published in Ufa

Башҡортостан Bashkortostan
- Type: Daily newspaper
- Format: Broadsheet
- Editor-in-chief: Ralif Kinyabayev
- Founded: June, 1917
- Language: Bashkir language
- Headquarters: Ufa
- Circulation: 33,000

Bashkortostan (Bashkir: Башҡортостан) is a leading Bashkir-language newspaper published in Ufa, named after the republic of Bashkortostan within the Russian Federation. It provides a wide coverage of the social, political and cultural events in the region.

The paper is published five times a week (except Sundays and Mondays). Its circulation of 33,000 is the largest among all Bashkir language printed publications.

The newspaper was started in June 1917 in Orenburg under the name «Башҡорт иттифаҡы бюроһының мөхбире» (Herald of the Bashkir regional bureau); in July same year it changed its name to «Башҡорт» (Bashkir). In 1919 it merged with another Bashkir-language paper called «Башҡортостан» (founded in 1918) and changed its name to «Башҡортостан хәбәрҙәре» (The Bulletin of Bashkortostan). For the first time after the merger, the editors' office was located in Sterlitamak, moving to Ufa in 1922.

In its early days, the newspaper was bilingual (Bashkir-Tatar). In 1924 it became monolingual. In 1929, it was converted into a daily format. In 1937, it changed its name to «Qьđьl Başqortostan» (The Red Bashkortostan), in 1951 to «Совет Башҡортостаны» (Soviet Bashkortostan). Starting with 1990, the paper carries its current name.

In the 1920s and the 1930s, Bashkortostan played a large role in establishing the standard Bashkir language as it is known today.

== See also ==
- Shagit Hudayberdin, editorial board member
