= Ræstdzinad =

Ossetian-language daily newspaper

- Type: general newspaper
- Founded: 14 March 1923
- Language: Ossetian
- Headquarters: Vladikavkaz
- Circulation: c. 15,000–20,000
- Website: http://rastdzinad.ru

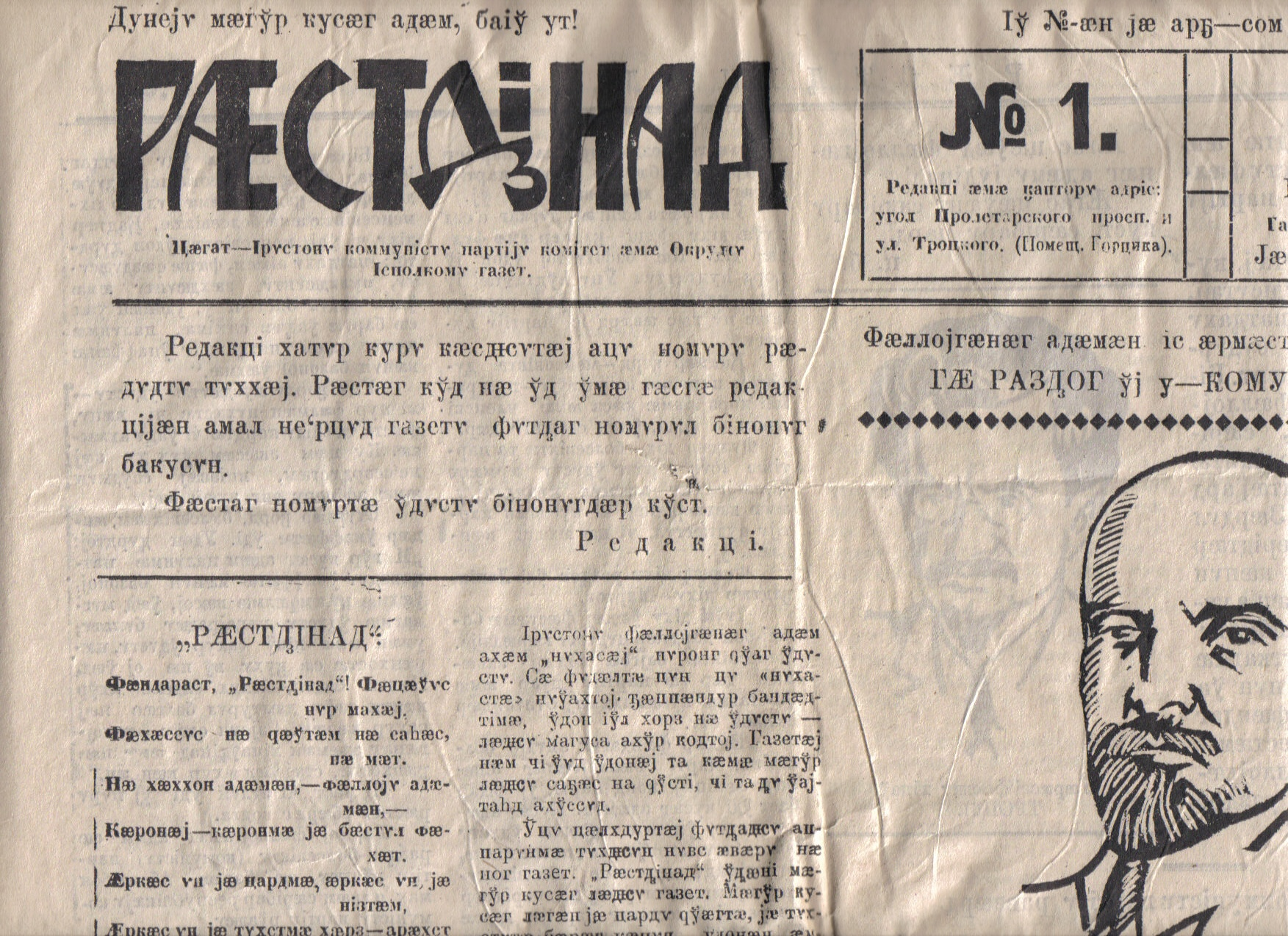
The first page of the first issue, 14 March 1923

Ræstdzinad (Ossetian: Рӕстдзинад; lit. 'Truth', spelled Рӕстꚉінад in the first issue, [rəst.d͡ʑiˈnad], Russian: Растдзинад) is an Ossetian language daily newspaper (excluding Sunday and Monday) published in Vladikavkaz, Russia, since March 14, 1923. The circulation during recent years stood at 15,000–20,000 copies.
