= Khurzarin =

Хурзæрин
- Type: Tri-weekly newspaper
- Founded: 1 January 1924
- Language: Ossetian
- Headquarters: Tskhinvali
- Circulation: 1700

Khurzarin or Xurzærin (Ossetian: Хурзæрин, Dawn) is the main Ossetian language newspaper of South Ossetia. Founded on 1 January 1924, Khurzarin is published three times a week, and has a circulation of 1,700 (down from 13,000 in 1975).

The newspaper received the Order of the Badge of Honour in 1973.

== Previous names ==
- 1924-1932: Хурзӕрин, Dawn
- 1932-1957: Коммунист, Communist
- 1957-199?: Советон Ирыстон, Soviet Ossetia.
