= Kyzyl Tan =

Кызыл Таң
- Owner(s): parliament and government of Bashkortostan
- Founded: 1918
- Language: Tatar
- Headquarters: ul. 50-let Oktyabrya 13; Ufa, Bashkortostan
- Circulation: c. 65.000 (1995)
- Website: http://kiziltan.ru/

Kyzyl Tan (Tatar: Кызыл таң, lit. Red Dawn) is a Tatar language newspaper published in Bashkortostan and Bashkortostan's official Tatar newspaper. It was founded as the organ of the Baskhir Province Committee of the Communist Part of the Soviet Union.

It was granted the Order of the Red Banner of Labour in 1968.

Previous names:

- 1918–1924: Башкортстан (Bashkiria)
- 1924–1930: Яңа авыл (New Village)
- 1930–1941: Коммуна (Commune)

Publication suspended during the Great Patriotic War; it restarted on 12 March 1944 under the current name.
