= Khypar =

Хыпар
- Founded: 21 January 1906
- Language: Chuvash
- Headquarters: pr. Ivana Yakovleva, 13; Cheboksary
- Circulation: c. 8.000
- Website: http://hypar.ru/

Khypar (Chuvash: Хыпар, lit. News) is a Chuvash language newspaper.

It was founded in 1906 in Kazan, moving to Cheboksary in 1918.

Previous names: «Канаш», «Чӑваш коммунӗ», «Коммунизм ялавӗ». It received the current name on 30 August 1990.

Newspaper's founder and first editor N. Nikolsky defined the main task - to serve the Chuvash people.

== Links ==
- Official site
- Страница газеты на портале «СМИ Чувашии»
