= Jasz people =

Hungarian subgroup of Eastern Iranic descent

Jász people
Regions with significant populations
- Jászság, Jász-Nagykun-Szolnok County, Hungary

Languages
- Hungarian, Jász (extinct)

Religion
- Christianity (Catholicism)

Related ethnic groups
- Hungarians, Ossetians, Asud, other Eastern Iranian peoples

The Jász (Latin: Jazones) are an Iranian ethnic group of Eastern Iranic descent who have lived in Hungary since the 13th century. They live mostly in a region known as Jászság, which comprises the north-western part of Jász-Nagykun-Szolnok county. They are sometimes known in English by the exonym Jassic and are also known by the endonyms Iasi and Jassy. They originated as a nomadic Alanic people from the Pontic steppe.

== Geography ==
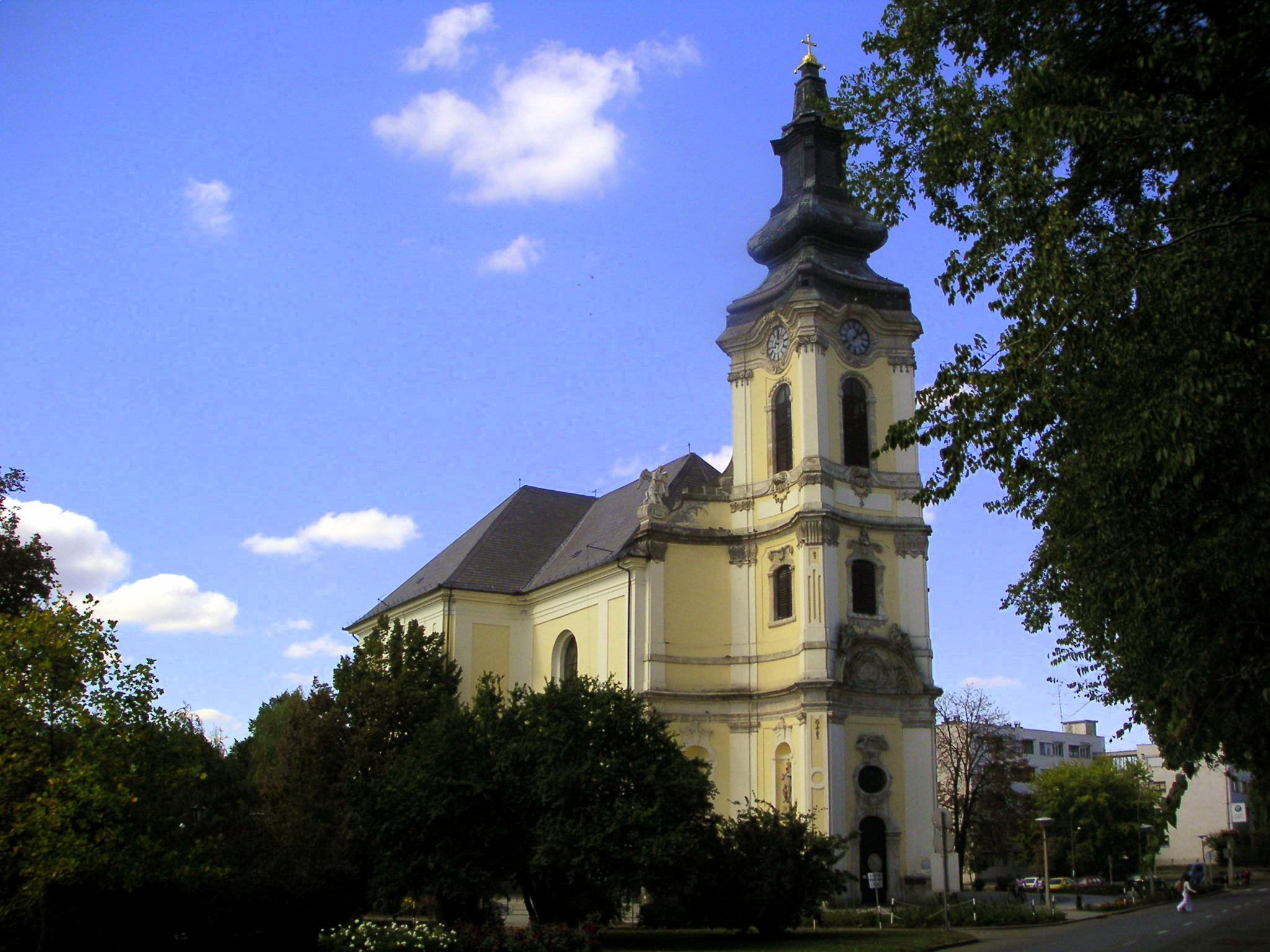
The main church in the center of Jászberény

The cultural and political center of Jászság is the town of Jászberény.

Jászság is sometimes, erroneously, known as "Jazygia", after a somewhat related Sarmatian people, the Iazyges, who lived in a similar area in ancient times.

== History ==
The Jász people descend from members of a nomadic people, the Alans, who originated on the Eurasian steppe and settled in the Kingdom of Hungary during the 13th century, following the Mongol invasions. Their language, which belonged to the East Iranian group that includes modern Ossetian, had reportedly become extinct by the 16th century, when the Jász adopted Hungarian.

Despite frequent claims to the contrary, their name is unrelated to that of the Jazyges, one of the Sarmatian tribes which, along with the Roxolani, reached the borders of Dacia during the late 1st century BC, over a thousand years before the Jász accompanied the Cumans into Hungary. This confusion is motivated by a superficial resemblance in the names as they appear in Roman transliteration: Hungarian sz is merely a digraph representing a voiceless s sound, while Greek zeta represented originally a voiced affricate (dz), or a combination of fricative and stop (zd), and the initial j in Jász isn't original to the word either. So then the two names actually have no more than an a in common. This confusion has a long history, as medieval scholars with a knowledge of classical history and writing in Latin were already referring to the Jász as Jazygians. The administrative unit within medieval Hungary settled by them is generally named "the Jazygian seat", a calque of the medieval Latin term used at the time.

The Jász people came to the Kingdom of Hungary, together with the Cumans (Hungarian: Kun people) when their lands to the east, in some in the later Moldavia (see Iași or Jászvásár) were invaded by the Mongol Empire in the mid-13th century. They were admitted by the Hungarian king, Béla IV Árpád, who hoped that the Jász would assist in resisting the Mongol-Tatar invasion. Shortly after their entry, the relationship worsened dramatically between the Hungarian nobility and the Cuman-Jász tribes, which then abandoned the country. After the end of the Mongol-Tatar invasion they returned and settled in the central part of the Pannonian Plain, near the rivers Zagyva and Tarna.

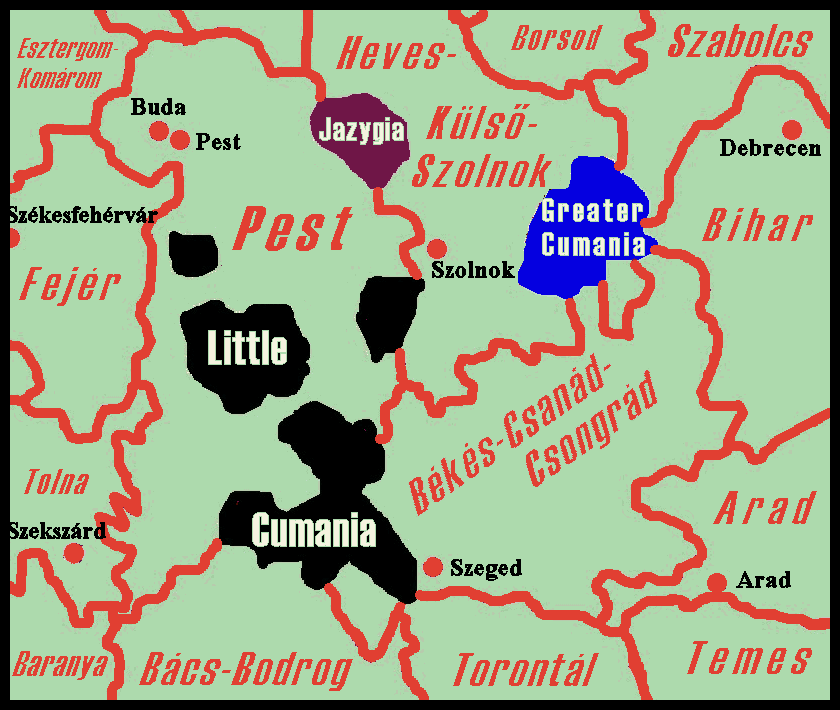
Jazygia (in purple) in the eighteenth century within the Habsburg Kingdom of Hungary

Initially, their main occupation was animal husbandry. Over the next two centuries they were assimilated into the Hungarian population; yet although their language disappeared, they preserved a distinct Jász identity. The Hungarian rulers granted the Jász people special privileges. Thus, the Jász were able to be more or less self-governing in an area known as Jászság in which Jászberény developed into the regional, cultural and administrative center.

In the 16th–17th centuries, areas populated by the Jász people were under Ottoman administration, but at the end of the 17th century they were recaptured and returned to the Kingdom of Hungary, which was then part of the Habsburg monarchy. Habsburg Emperor Leopold I sold the area to the Knights of the Teutonic Order. This saw the end of the privileged position of Jászberény. However, the Jász people did not want to accept this situation and started to collect money with which they could buy their freedom. By 1745, they had collected half a million Rhenish gold florins, a considerable sum for those days. However, in this time the famous 'Act of Redemption' took place: the Empress Maria Theresa restored the Jász land and Jász hereditary privileges. From this point onwards, Jászberény flourished. The Jász regional autonomy was preserved until the year 1876, when the area populated by the Jász was administratively included into the Jász-Nagykun-Szolnok County.

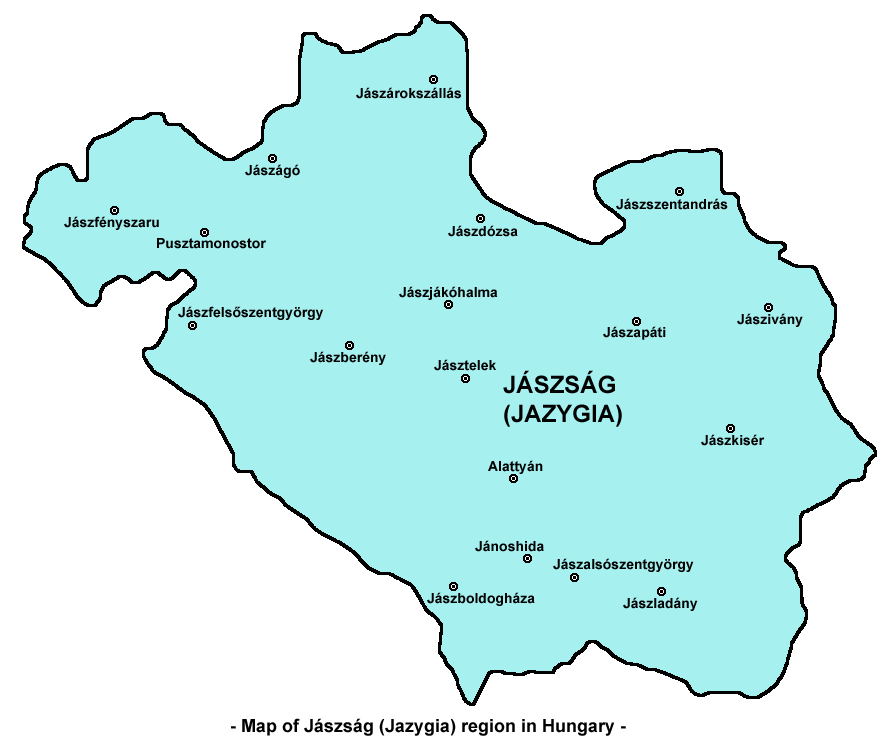
Map of Jászság (Jazygia)

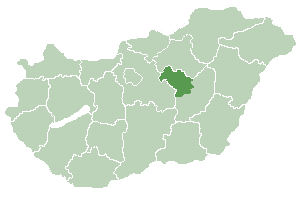
Jászság (Jazygia) within modern Hungary

After dissolution of Austria-Hungary in 1918, areas populated by the Jász people were included into an independent Hungary. Over a dozen settlements in the Great Hungarian Plain (e.g. the names Jászberény, Jászárokszállás, Jászfényszaru, Jászalsószentgyörgy) still include a link to the Jász. In 1995, the 250th Anniversary of the Act of Redemption was celebrated in Jászberény with the President of Hungary as guest of honor as well as with numerous foreign dignitaries.

== Language ==
Jassic is the common name in English for the original language of the Jász. It was a dialect of Ossetian, an Eastern Iranian language. Jassic became extinct and was replaced by Hungarian. The only literary record of the Jász language was found in the 1950s in the Hungarian National Széchényi Library. The language was reconstructed with the help of various Ossetian analogies.

== Genetics ==
Genetic studies on people from various Jász regions, have established a firm link towards other Hungarian ethnic groups, while simultaneously having shown a significant shift towards Iranian peoples, and especially Turkic ethnic groups with significant Sarmatian-related ancestry such as the Bashkirs of Bashkortostan.

Y-DNA haplogroups among people from Jász regions have been shown to be more diverse than those of other Hungarian people.

== Notable people of Jassic descent ==
- Sándor Csányi
- István Csukás

== Related articles and peoples ==
- Alans
- Hungarians
- Székelys
- Saka
- Scythians
- Iron people
