= Jassic Ossetian =

Extinct Ossetian dialect of Hungary

Jassic
- Yassic
- jász
- Native to: Hungary
- Region: Jász–Nagykun–Szolnok County
- Ethnicity: Jassic people
- Extinct: 17th century
- Language family: Indo-European: Indo-Iranian; Iranian; Northeastern; Scythian; Western; Alanic; Ossetian; Jassic

Language codes
- ISO 639-3: ysc
- Glottolog: jass1238

Jassic (Hungarian: jász) is an extinct dialect of the Ossetian language once spoken in Hungary, named after the Jász people, a nomadic people that settled in Hungary in the 13th century.

== History ==
The Jasz (Jassic) people came to Hungary together with the Cumans, chased by the Mongols. They were admitted by the Hungarian king Béla IV, hoping that they would assist in fighting against a Mongol-Tatar invasion. But shortly after their entry, the relationship worsened dramatically between the Hungarian nobility and the Cumanian-Jassic tribes and they left the country. After the end of the Mongol-Tatar occupation they returned and were settled in the central part of the Hungarian Plain.

Initially, their main occupation was animal husbandry. During the next two centuries they were assimilated into the Hungarian population and their language disappeared, but they preserved their Jassic identity and their regional autonomy until 1876. Over a dozen settlements in Central Hungary (e.g. Jászberény, Jászárokszállás, and Jászfényszaru) still bear their name. The historical, ethnographical and geographical region of Jászság, as well as of the modern Jász-Nagykun-Szolnok County, are among the many place names linked to them. The name of the city of Iași in Romania may also derive from the name of the people.

The only literary record of the Jassic language was found in the 1950s in the Hungarian National Széchényi Library. It is a one-page glossary containing 34 words mainly related to products of agriculture (types of grain, cattle, etc.) probably compiled for fiscal or mercantile purposes. The glossary was interpreted with the help of Ossetian analogues from the Digor dialect. (Németh 1959)

== Jassic Glossary ==
=== Reading ===
Based on Anton Fekete's transcription, Nagy Gyula Németh read the monument as follows:

1. da ban horz nahechsa Sose [z?]

2. panis carnis brodiu(m)

3. khevef fit baza zana wi[u]um

4. Jayca (v? w? m?) она karcen [?] pises [o?]

5. dan aqtia manaona furme(n)tum

6. Zabar auena huwaz fenu(m)

7. Karbach arpa huvar kovu (?)les

8. casa (fo fej tc) cocta Orae boza tabak

9. scutela Chugan olla odok colftjar

10. Gist fomagium Charif

11. vay karak pulltis

12. Caz auca kuraynu molen???

13. lapi(de)s Bah ecus acha fuv

14. Gal Bos fvs oves

15. Ere fo[a?]ca(n) khvnge ad (ev?)f suporc(us)

16. saca capar vas bidellu(m)

17. docega vacca Gu(?)za doctillu[?i?]s

18. Bucha pacta

=== Jassic Words ===
Most Jassic words are comparable to the Digor dialect of Ossetian. Some examples are:

English	Jassic	Ossetian
Bread	K'ever	K'æbær
Bull	Gal	Gal
Chicken	Kar(a)k	Kark
Day	Ban	Bon
Duck	Assa	Ass/Assæ
Egg	Jaika	Ajkæ
Goose	Qaz	Qaž/Qaz
Horse	Basx	Bæx
Millet	Huvar	Xor/Xwar
Our	Νa	Næ
Plate	Tabac	Tæbæğ
Sheep	Fus	Fyš/Fus
Spoon	Odok	Widyg/Jedug
Water	Dan	Don
Woman	Osa (?)	Uš/Osæ

However the Jász-word glossary interpreted by Németh doesn’t actually include the words K'ever, Jaika, Tabac, Kar(a)k, Qaz, Basx, and Assa, as listed here above. It has rather Jaÿca, tabak, (C)karak, Caz, Bah, and acha, and the glossary doesn’t include a word for woman at all.

== See also ==
- Jasz (Jassic) people
