= Dolovo =

Dolovo may refer to:

- Dolovo, Pančevo, a village in Serbia
- Dolovo, Tutin, a village in Serbia
- Dolova, Croatia, or Dolovo, a ghost village on Krk island
