= Abieta (ancient city) =

Abieta is marked on Ptolemy's 9th map in his Geography.

Abíeta (Ancient Greek: Ἀβίητα) was an ancient city mentioned by Ptolemy. It was located between the Middle Danube and the Tisza River, in what was considered the territory of Metanasian Iazyges.
