= Bormanum =

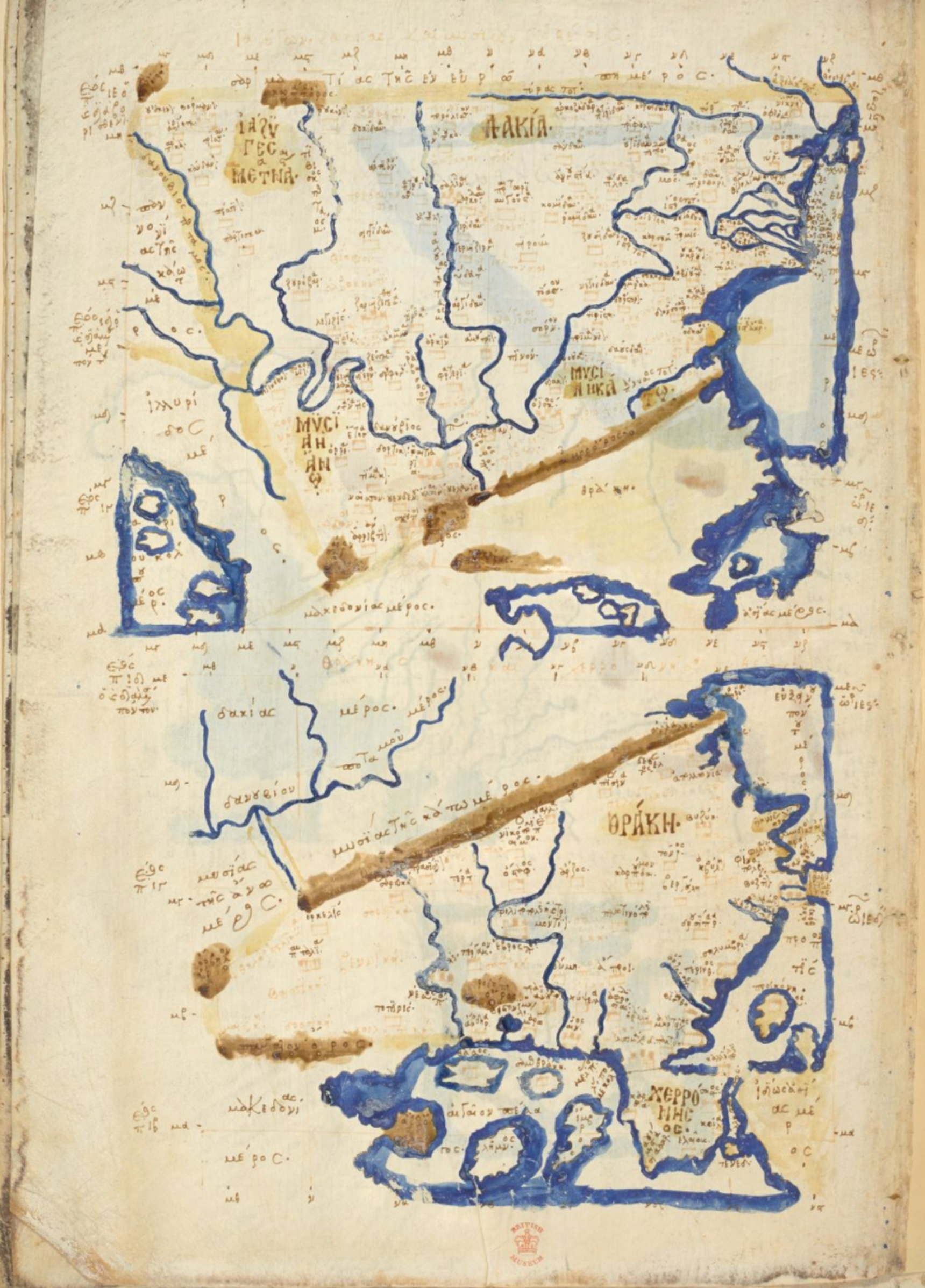
Bormanum is marked on Ptolemy's 9th Map in his Geography.

Bormanum (Ancient Greek: Βόρμανον) was an ancient city mentioned by Ptolemy. It was located between the Middle Danube and the Tisza River, in what was considered the territory of the Iazyges Metanastæ.
