= Banadaspus =

- King
- Reign: Unknown – 174 AD
- Predecessor: Unknown
- Successor: Zanticus

Banadaspus was king of the Iazyges from an unknown date until 174 AD. He was overthrown by his people after attempting to make a peace deal with the Roman Empire. Zanticus succeeded him as king of the Iazyges.

== Etymology ==
The name is recorded in Greek as Βαναδασπος (Banadaspos) by Dio Cassius. It is reconstructed as *Wanadasp, deriving from the Sarmatian language, and means “possessing winning/conquering horses.”
