= Uscenum =

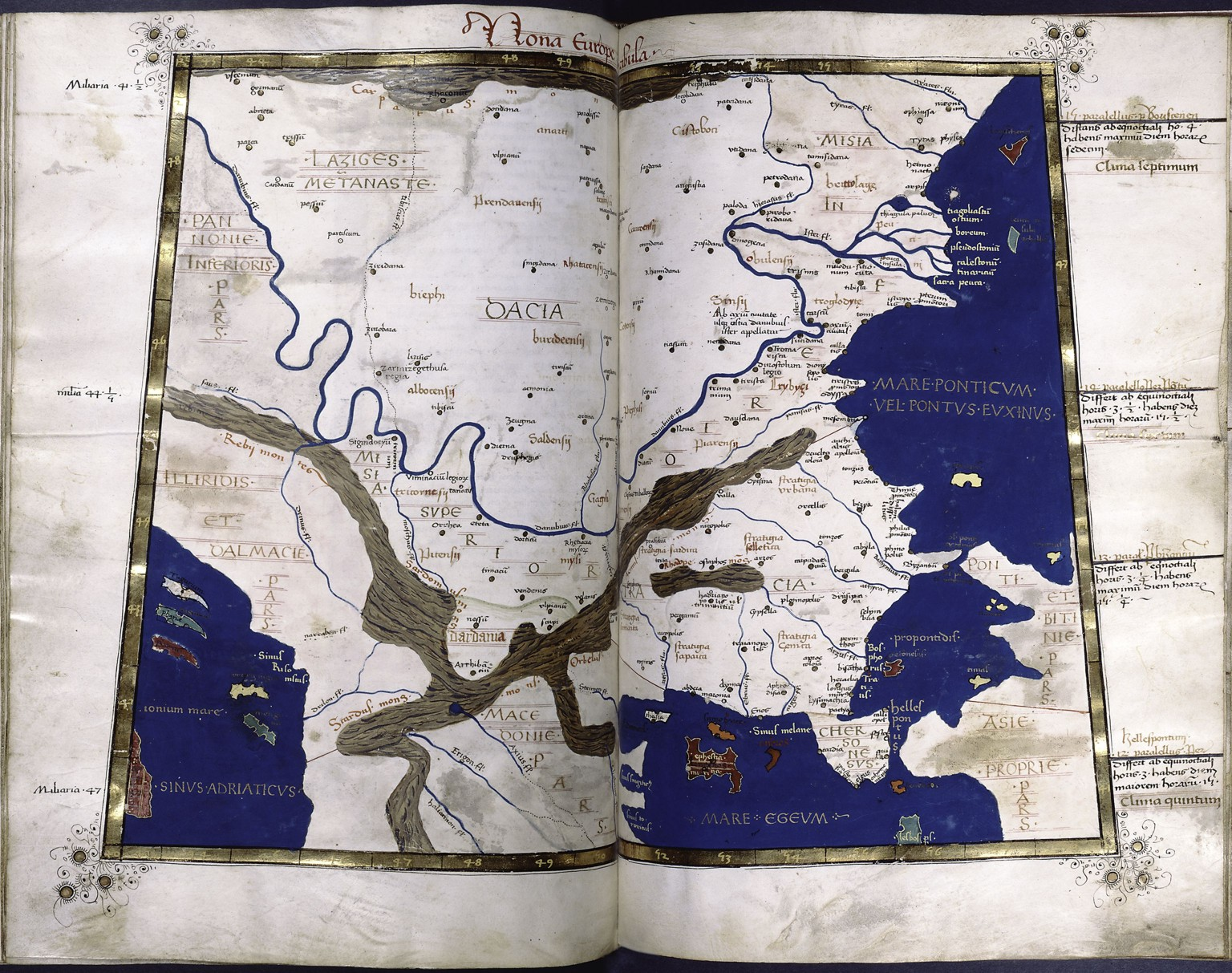
Uscenum is marked on Ptolemy's 9th map in his Geography.

Uscenum or Véskenon (Ancient Greek: Οὔσκενον / Οὔεσκενον) was an ancient city mentioned by Ptolemy. It was located between the Middle Danube and the Tisza River, in what was considered the territory of the Iazyges Metanastæ.
