= Trissum =

Ancient city mentioned by Ptolemy

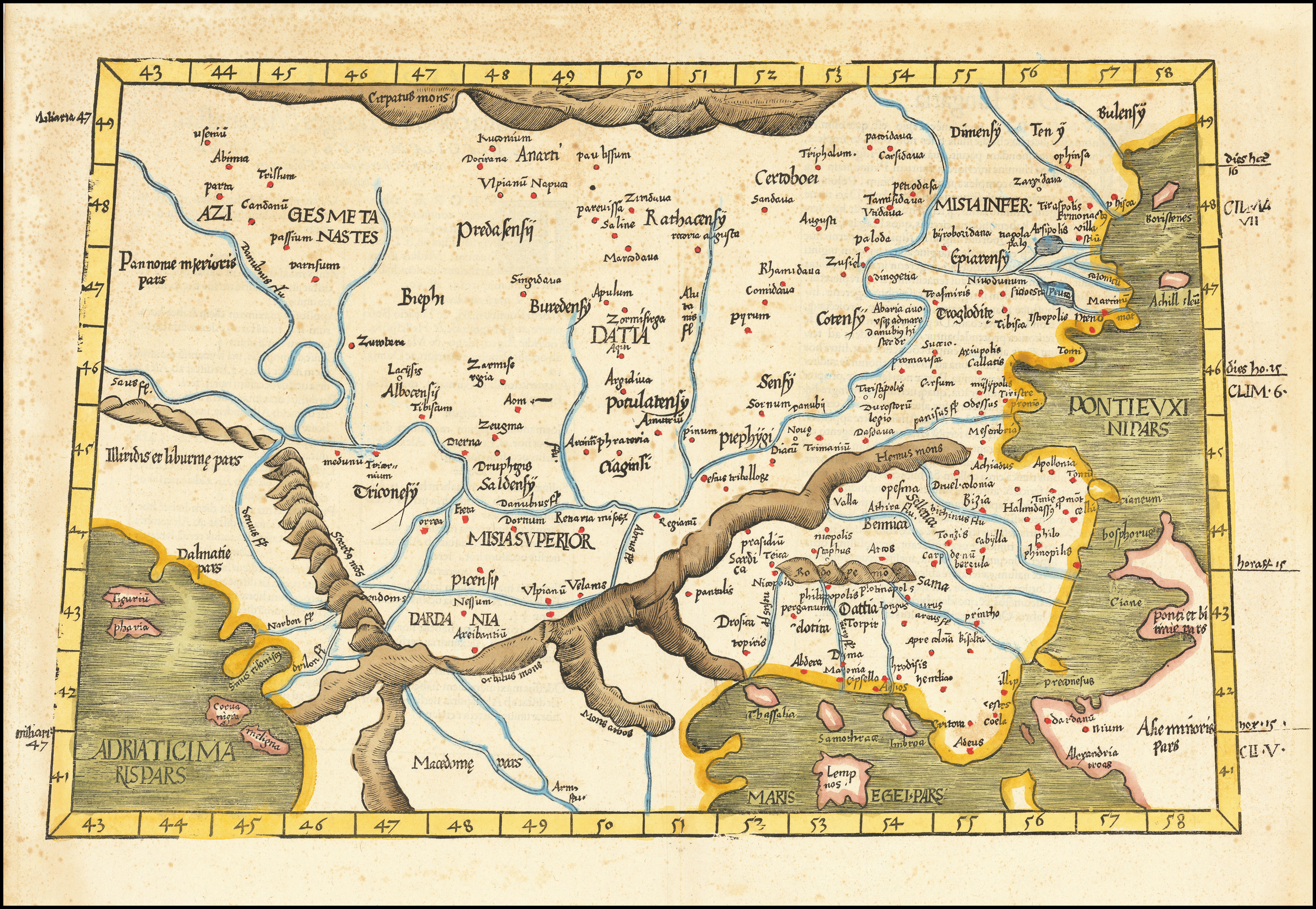
Trissum is marked on Ptolemy's 9th map in his Geography.

Trissúm (Ancient Greek: Τρισσόν) was an ancient city mentioned by Ptolemy. It was located between the Middle Danube and the Tisza River, in what was considered the territory of Metanasian Iazyges.
