= Dolovo, Pančevo =

Dolovo Долово
- Village (Selo)
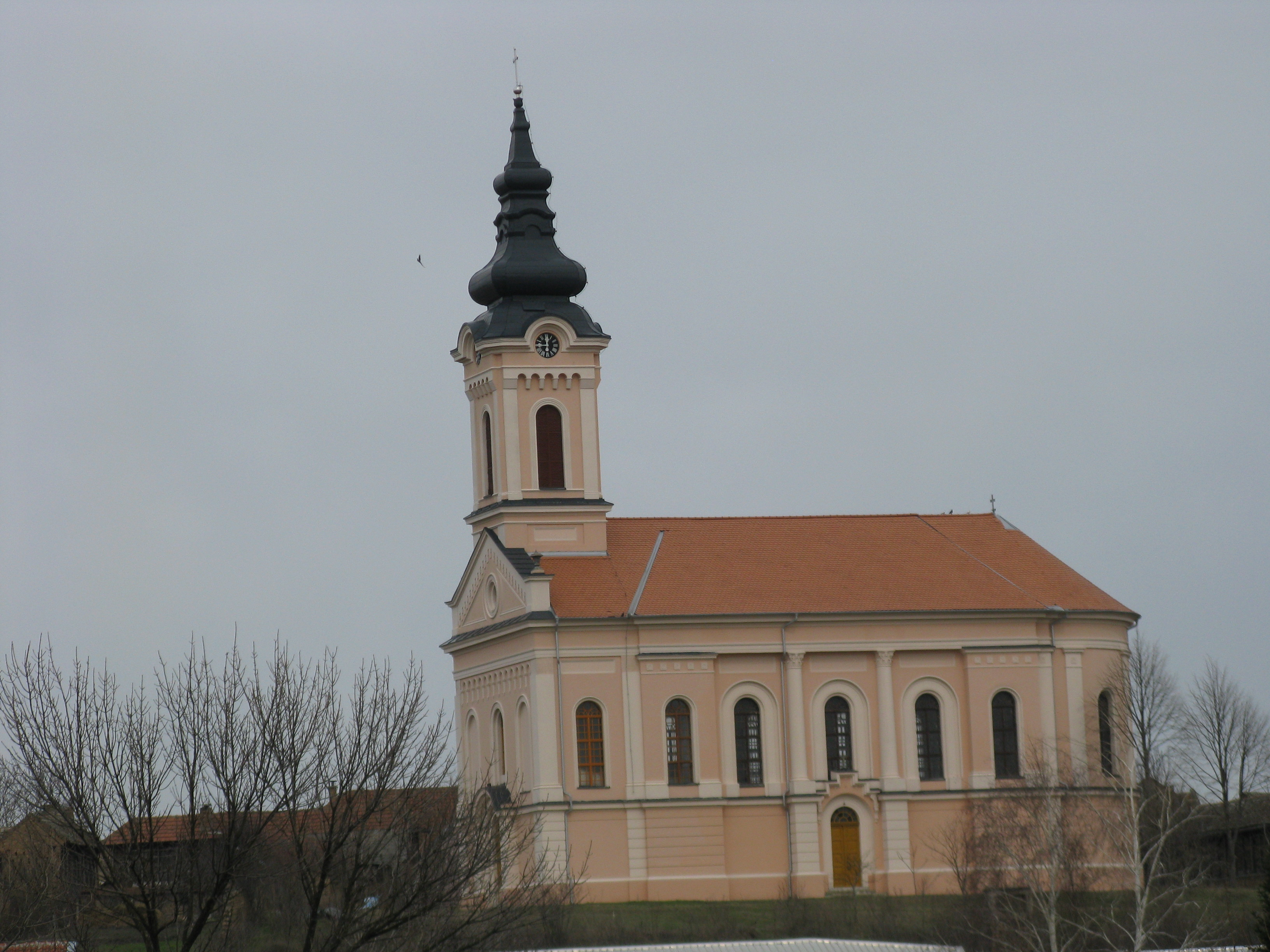
- Serbian Orthodox Church Saint Nicholas

- Location of Dolovo within Serbia Dolovo (Serbia) Dolovo (Europe)
- Coordinates: 44°54′02″N 20°52′23″E
- Country: Serbia
- Province: Vojvodina
- District: South Banat
- Municipality: Pančevo

Area
  - Total: 117.17 km^{2} (45.24 sq mi)

Population (2022)
  - Total: 5,569
  - Density: 47.53/km^{2} (123.1/sq mi)
- Time zone: UTC+1 (CET)
  - Summer (DST): UTC+2 (CEST)
- Area code: +381(0)13
- Car plates: PA

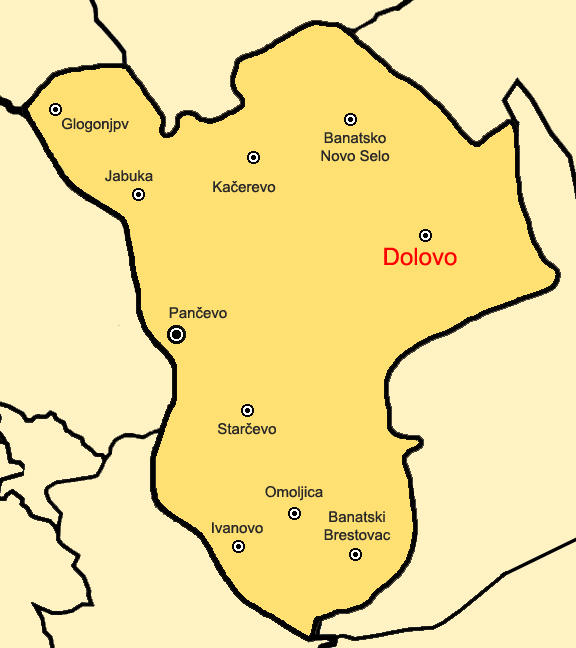
Map of Pančevo municipality

Dolovo (Serbian Cyrillic: Долово, Romanian: Doloave) is a village in Serbia. It is situated in the Pančevo municipality, in the South Banat District, Vojvodina province. The village has a Serb ethnic majority and its population is 5,569 (2022 census). The place name means location of troughs.

== Historical population ==
- 1948: 5,983
- 1953: 6,273
- 1961: 6,766
- 1971: 6,582
- 1981: 6,836
- 1991: 6,790
- 2002: 5,346 (5,346 Serbs, 927 Romanians, 83 Romani people and 479 Others)

== See also ==
- List of cities, towns and villages in Serbia
- List of cities, towns and villages in Vojvodina

== Gallery ==
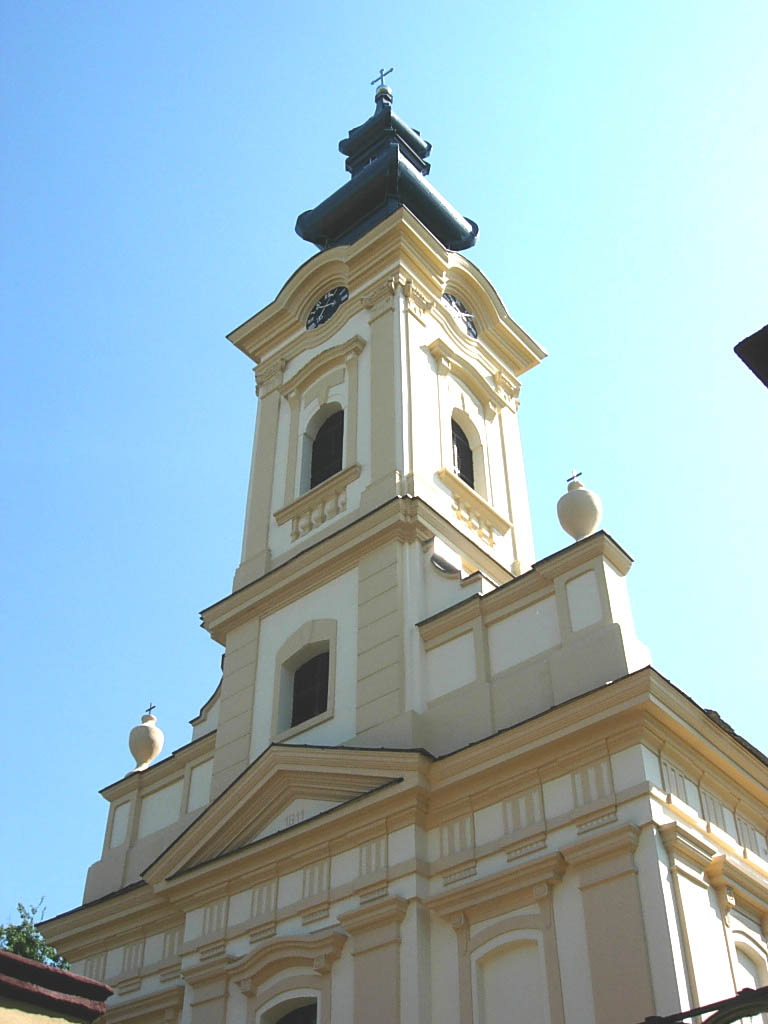
Bell tower of the Serbian Orthodox Church

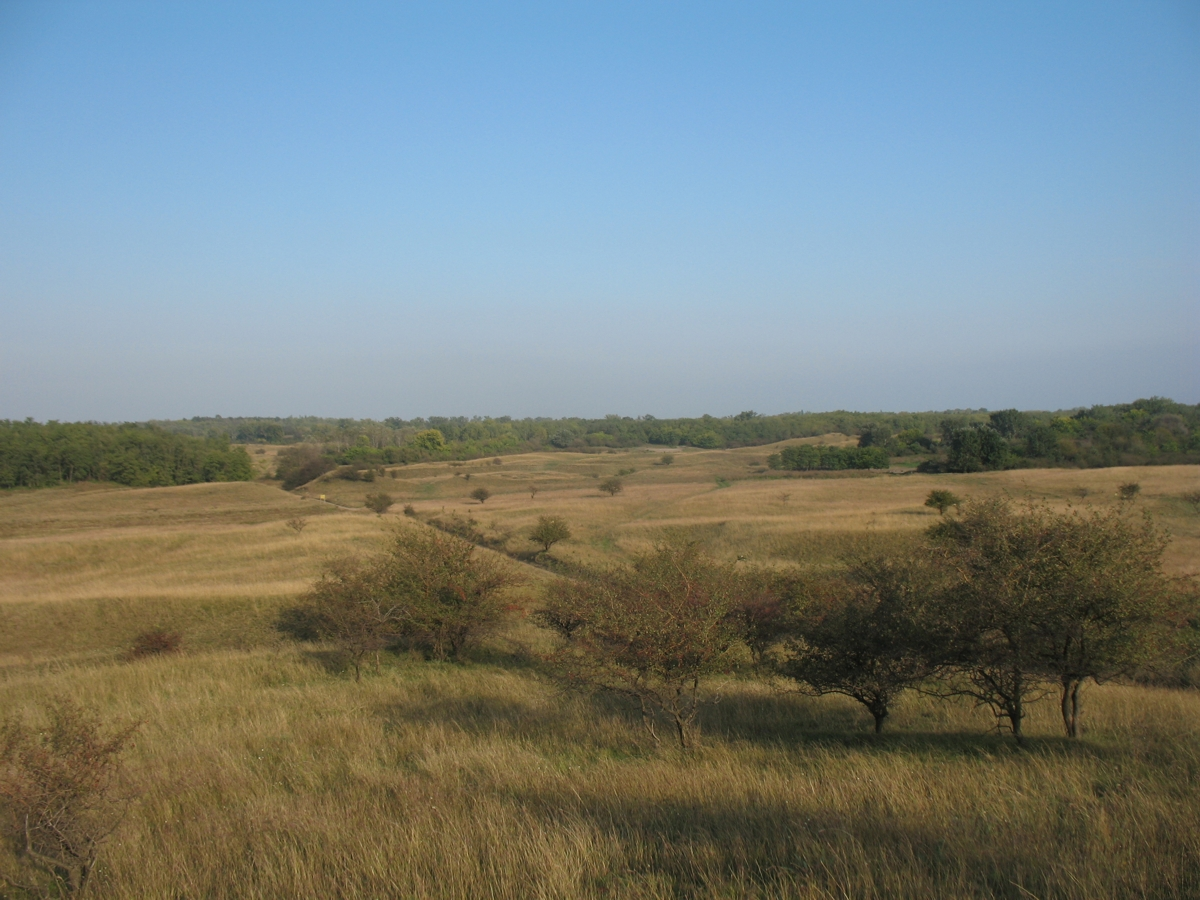
Northwestern part of Deliblatska peščara nearby Dolovo
