= List of Ossetians =

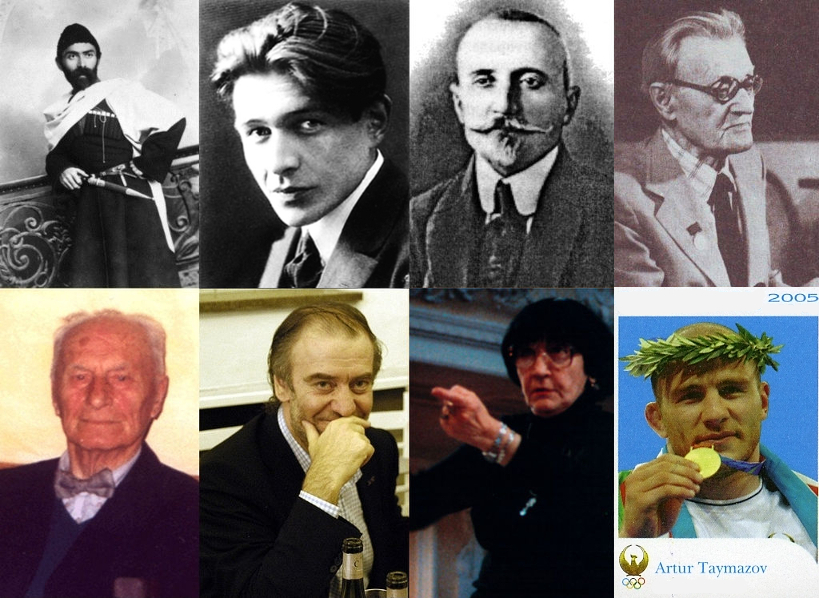
1st row: Khetagurov • Gazdanov • Kotsoev • Abaev 2nd row: Tokaty • Gergiev • Dudarova • Taymazov

This is an incomplete list of world-famous or notable Ossetians, including both full and partial Ossetian ancestry.

== Cultural ==
=== Cultural figures ===
- Valery Gergiev – General director and artistic director of the Mariinsky Theatre, former chief conductor of the Rotterdam Philharmonic Orchestra and of the Munich Philharmonic
- Tugan Sokhiev – Russian conductor.
- Elbert Tuganov – Azerbaijani-Estonian animator and film director.

=== Historians and writers ===
- Gaito Gazdanov – Russian émigré writer of Ossetian descent
- Kosta Khetagurov – Ossetian national poet
- Arsen Kotsoev – one of the founders of Ossetic prose
- Vladimir Gagloyev – Ossetian writer, playwright and publicist
- Manana Chitishvili – Georgian poet and academic
- Elbadzuko Britayev – founder of Ossetian traditional theatre

=== Architects ===
- Vitaly Kaloyev – Russian former architect and convicted murderer

== Sports ==
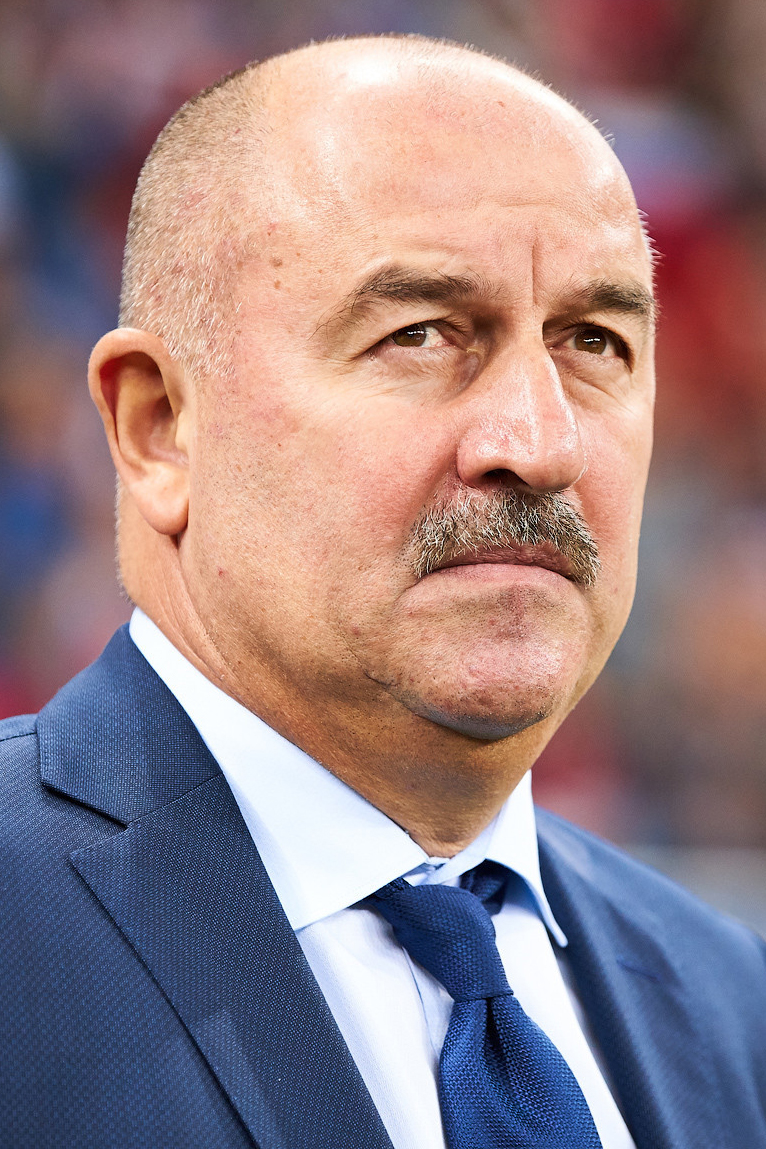
Stanislav Cherchesov

=== Football ===
- Alan Dzagoev – former Russian professional footballer
- Vladimir Salbiyev – former Russian professional footballer
- Vladimir Gabulov – goalkeeper
- Ruslan Bolov – Russian professional football player
- Stanislav Cherchesov – football manager of the Kazakhstan national team
- Khetag Khosonov – Russian football player
- Shota Bibilov – professional footballer
- Artur Yelbayev – Russian former professional football player
- Zaza Eloshvili – Georgian footballer
- Artur Pagayev – association football coach
- Soslanbek Arshiyev – professional football player

=== Martial Arts ===
- Soslan Ramonov – freestyle wrestler, 2016 Olympics gold medalist
- Ruslan Karaev – professional kickboxer
- Murat Gassiev – Russian former unified cruiserweight world champion
- Khetag Gazyumov – retired Russian and Azerbaijani freestyle wrestler, Olympic medalist
- Zelym Kotsoiev – Ukrainian-Azerbaijani judoka, 2024 Summer olympics gold medalist
- Amiran Kardanov – Russian and Greek Freestyle wrestler, 2000 Olympics bronze medalist
- Taimuraz Tigiev – Russian-Kazakhstani wrestler, 2008 Summer Olympics silver medalist
- Arsen Fadzaev – former Soviet wrestler, 1988 and 1992 Olympics gold medalist
- Makharbek Khadartsev – former Soviet wrestler, 1988 and 1992 Olympics gold medalist
- Zaurbek Sokhiev – Russian-Ossetian male freestyle wrestler
- Artur Taymazov – Uzbek-Russian wrestler and politician, 2004 Olympics gold medalist
- Soslan Tigiev – Russian-Uzbekistani wrestler
- Ibragim Aldatov – Ukrainian freestyle wrestler
- Dzhambolat Tedeyev – Russian-Ukrainian former wrestler
- Elbrus Tedeyev – Ukrainian wrestler, 2004 Olympics gold medalist
- Mirabi Valiyev – Ukrainian former wrestler
- Zaza Zazirov – former Ukrainian wrestler, 1996 Olympics bronze medalist
- Khadzhimurat Gatsalov – Russian wrestler, 2004 Olympics gold medalist
- Aslanbek Alborov – Russian former freestyle wrestler
- Vladislav Baitcaev – Russian freestyle wrestler
- Zaur Makiev – Russian former freestyle wrestler
- Artur Naifonov – Russian freestyle wrestler, 2020 Olympics bronze medalist
- Zaurbek Sidakov – Russian freestyle wrestler, 2020 Olympics gold medalist
- Diana Avsaragova – Russian mixed martial artist
- Tajmuraz Salkazanov – Slovak naturalized freestyle wrestler
- Azamat Tuskaev – Russian freestyle wrestler

==== Sumo wrestlers ====
- Hakurozan Yūta – former sumo wrestler
- Alan Karaev – Russian sumo wrestler
- Rohō Yukio – former sumo wrestler. The highest rank he achieved was komusubi
- Wakanohō Toshinori – retired Russian sumo wrestler. His highest rank was maegashira 1

=== Weightlifting ===
- Timur Taymazov – former Ossetian-Ukrainian weightlifter, 1996 Olympics gold medalist
- Arsen Kasabiev – Polish-Georgian weightlifter, 2008 Olympics silver medalist
- Alan Naniyev – Russian born Azerbaijani male weightlifter
- Tima Turieva – Russian weightlifter

=== Misc ===
- Vladislav Mirzoev – Russian pair skater
- Zarina Gizikova – Russian retired individual rhythmic gymnast
- Masha Gordon – British businesswoman, explorer and mountain climber
- Chermen Kobesov – Russian para-athlete
- Elizaveta Shanaeva – Russian competitive ice dancer.

== Entrepreneurs ==
- Mykola Bagrayev – Ukrainian businessman and social activist
- Igor Kesaev – owner and president of the Mercury Group
- Taimuraz Bolloyev – CEO of Baltika Breweries

== Politicians, Kings and activists ==
- Isabel Magkoeva – Russian political activist
- Znaur Gassiev – South Ossetian politician, who was one of the leaders of the South Ossetian independence movement in the early 1990s
- David Soslan – Alanian prince, consort of Queen Tamar
- Durgulel the Great – Alanian king of the 11th century, under whom Alania reached its economic and military peak
- Kazbek Elkanovich Tedeyev – Ukrainian prosecutor and public figure
- Kanukov Dzhambulat – Colonel of the Aviation of the Western Ukrainian Republic.
- Dmitry Sanakoyev – former Ministry of Defence of South Ossetia, Prime Minister of South Ossetia, and head of the Provisional Administration of South Ossetia

=== Presidents of South Ossetia ===
- Lyudvig Chibirov – 1st President of South Ossetia
- Eduard Kokoity – 2nd President of South Ossetia
- Leonid Tibilov – 4th President of South Ossetia
- Anatoly Bibilov – 5th President of South Ossetia
- Alan Gagloyev – current President of South Ossetia

== Military ==
- Sergey Khabalov – Imperial Russian Army general
- Issa Pliyev – Soviet military commander
- Kantemir Tsalikov – Red Army major general who held division and corps command during World War II
- Akhsarbek Abaev – Red Army Sergeant and Hero of the Soviet Union
- Emir Saad – Ossetian Islamist militant

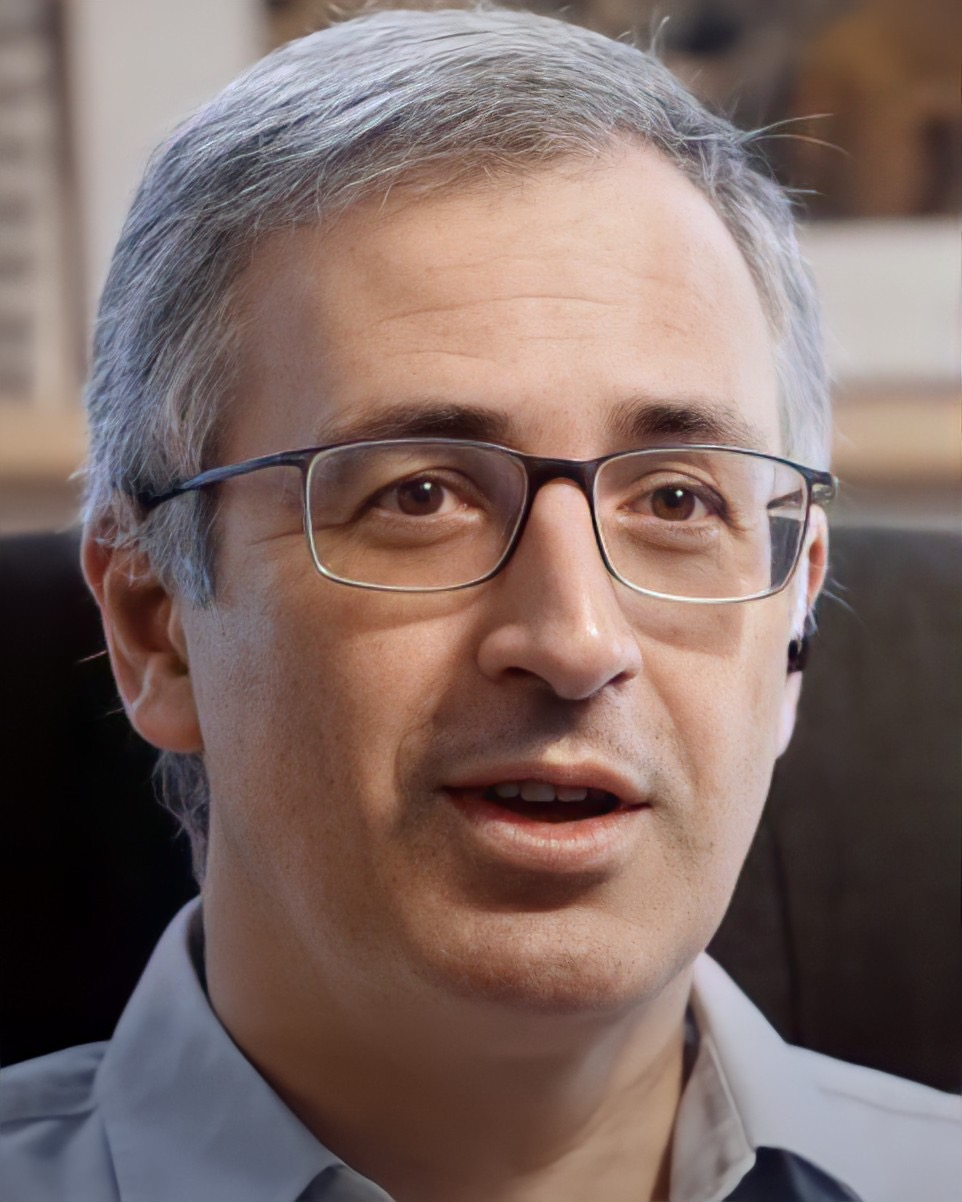
Sergey Guriyev

== Scholars ==
- Sergey Guriyev – economist, dean and a professor of economics at the London Business School, former rector at Moscow's New Economic School (NES)
- Grigori Tokaty – Soviet rocket scientist and politician
- Vasily Abaev – Soviet linguist
- Magomet Isayev – linguist and Esperantist

== Artists ==
=== Film, TV, and stage ===
- Alec Utgoff – actor
- Alan Badoev – Ukrainian movie director
- Svetlana Adyrkhaeva – Soviet and Russian ballerina
- Zemfira Tsakhilova – Soviet and Russian actress and teacher

=== Musicians and painters ===
- Maharbek Tuganov – Ossetian painter
- Zlata Chochieva – Russian pianist
- Alan Khadzaragov – Russian musician and rapper
- Elena Tsallagova – Russian operatic soprano
- Veronika Dudarova – Soviet and Russian conductor, the first woman to succeed as conductor of symphony orchestras in the 20th century

== See also ==
- Ossetians
- Ossetia
- Digor people
- Jasz people
