= Iranian literature =

Iranian literature, or Iranic literature, refers to the literary traditions of the Iranian languages, developed predominantly in Iran and other regions in the Middle East and the Caucasus, eastern Asia Minor, and parts of western Central Asia and northwestern South Asia. These include works attested from as early as the 6th century BC. Modern Iranian literatures include Persian literature, Ossetian literature, Kurdish literature, Pashto literature, and Balochi literature, among others.

== Classical and medieval eras ==
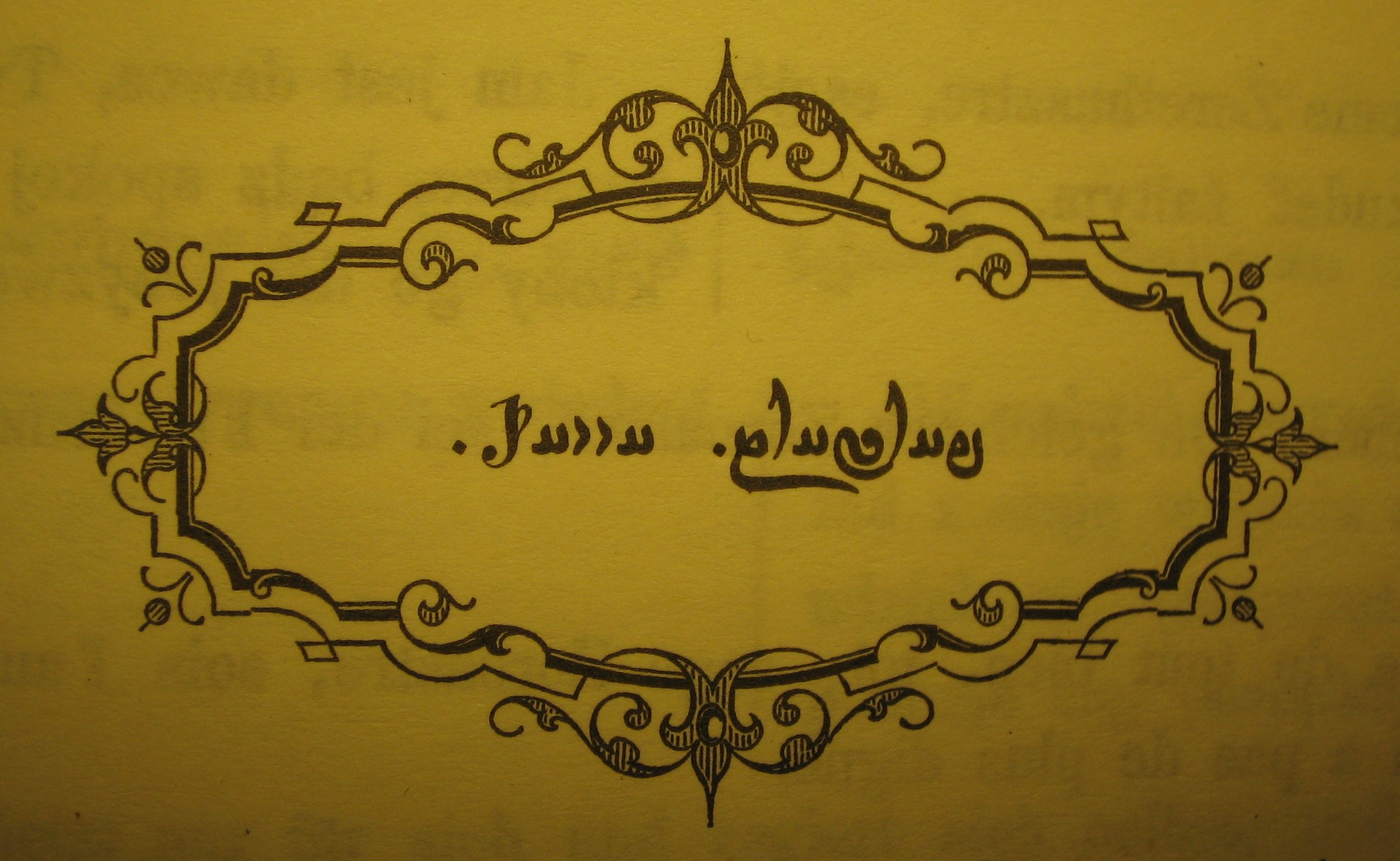
The title of a published Zend Avesta reading pargart auual in Pazend, a variant of the Avestan alphabet.

=== Avestan ===
The earliest surviving literary works in an Iranian language are that of the religious texts of the Avesta, written in Avestan, an Old Iranian sacred language. The oldest part of these are the Gathas (𐬔𐬁𐬚𐬁, Gāθā, "hymn"), that are a collection of hymns believed to be composed by Zoroaster, the reformer of the ancient Iranian religion and the founder of Zoroastrianism, dating to the 6th century BC.

=== Old Persian, Parthian, and Middle Persian ===
Old Persian, the earliest form of the Persian language that is attested on several inscriptions from between the 6th to the 4th century BC, gave rise to Middle Persian in the 3rd century BC, which later produced a number of literary works centered in religious Manichaean and Zoroastrian books written between the 3rd to the 10th century AD. Parthian, another Middle Iranian language which dates to the first three centuries AD and was likely mutually intelligible with Middle Persian, was also used in Manichaean texts, and is regarded, along with Middle Persian, as one of the bases of the modern Persian language.

=== Khotanese ===
Khotanese literary works, written in a dialect of the Saka language that was used by the Saka Kingdom of Khotan on the southern branch of the Silk Road, centered mostly in Buddhist texts and were produced mainly between the 5th to the 10th centuries.

=== Sogdian ===
Sogdian literature, dating mainly from the 9th and 10th centuries in Sogdia, was centered in Manichaean, Buddhist, and Christian texts.

=== Bactrian ===
A few Bactrian manuscript fragments have also been discovered, dating between the 4th to the 9th century.

== Modern era ==
=== Persian ===
Of the living Iranian languages, Persian has been the most influential. Various modern dialects of Persian are spoken natively by the Persians, Tajiks, Hazaras, and Aimaqs, among others, of which three standardized variants, namely Western Persian (or simply "Persian"), Dari, and Tajik, are used officially in Iran, Afghanistan, and Tajikistan. Modern Persian literature originates from its earlier forms in the 9th century, although it is also considered to be a continuation of works from much older stages of the language. In spite of originating from the region of Persis (better known as Persia) in southwestern Iran, the Persian language was used and developed further through Persianate societies in Asia Minor, Central Asia, and South Asia, leaving massive influences on Ottoman and Mughal literatures, among others.

=== Ossetian ===
Ossetian, the only surviving descendant of the ancient Scytho-Sarmatian (Alanic) languages that was written for the first time on an inscription dating from the 10th to 12th century, has a literary tradition that originates from the 17th century, with the first Ossetian book printed in 1798, although it also has a large body of older folkloric epics. It is spoken predominantly by the Ossetians in Ossetia, a region split between Georgia and Russia in the Caucasus, and is used officially by the Russian republic of North Ossetia-Alania and the autonomous State of Alania. Ossetian literature is based mainly on its prestigious Iron dialect, which is also used administratively.

=== Kurdish ===
Kurdish, spoken natively by the Kurds throughout Kurdistan and used officially by the autonomous Region of Kurdistan in northern Iraq and the autonomous federation of Rojava in northern Syria, has a literary tradition whose earliest works are those of Malaye Jaziri, a 16th-century influential Kurdish poet from Jazira who used the Kurmanji dialect, and of at least one writer before him, in addition to the orally transmitted folk poetry and prose narratives. Gurani, spoken by the Guran Kurds mainly in Hawraman, also produced a literary tradition beginning in the 16th century.

=== Pashto ===
Pashto, one of Afghanistan's two official languages and the second-largest regional language of Pakistan that is spoken natively by the Pashtuns, has developed a literature since the 17th or possibly the 11th century, producing works mainly through its prestigious coastal dialects.

=== Balochi ===
Balochi, spoken natively by the Baloch people throughout Balochistan, has a literary tradition starting from the early 19th century.
