= Zaza =

Zaza may refer to:

== Arts and entertainment ==
- Zaza (play), written by French playwrights Pierre Berton and Charles Simon
- Zaza (1915 film), a film directed by Edwin S. Porter
- Zaza (1923 film), a film directed by Allan Dwan
- Zaza (1938 film), a film directed by George Cukor
- Zaza (1956 film), a French drama film
- Za-Za, an album by the BulletBoys
- Zazà, a 1900 opera by Ruggero Leoncavallo
- "Zaza", alias of the character Albin in La Cage aux Folles and its derivative works
- Zaza (song), a song by 6ix9ine

== People ==
- Zazas, a group of people in eastern Anatolia (southeastern Turkey)
  - Zaza–Gorani languages, Indo-Iranian languages
  - Zaza language, spoken by the Zazas

=== Given name ===
- Zaza (name), Georgian given name
- Zaza (1986 – 2025), American artist also known as Diana Oh
- Zaza Sor. Aree (born 1993), Thai kickboxer
- Zaza Enden (born 1976), Turkish professional wrestler
- Zaza Harvey (1879–1954), American baseball player
- Zaza Zazirov (born 1972), Ukrainian Olympic athlete

=== Surname ===
- Hend Zaza (born 2009), Syrian Olympic table tennis player
- Karim Zaza (born 1975), Moroccan goalkeeper
- Michele Zaza (born 1945–1994), Italian businessman
- Neil Zaza, American guitar player
- Paul Zaza (1952), Canadian songwriter
- Shane Zaza, British actor
- Simone Zaza (born 1991), Italian footballer
- Teresita Zazá (1893–1980), Spanish tonadillera, cupletista, and actress
- Wellington Zaza (born 1995), Liberian athlete

== Places ==
- Alto Zaza, a commune in Angola
- Zaza Reservoir, a reservoir in Cuba
- Zaza, Rwanda, a community in Rwanda

== Other uses ==
- A slang term for cannabis (marijuana and hashish)
- A slang term for tianeptine
- A name that appears in the Bible, in the first of the Books of Chronicles 2:33, meaning "belonging to all" or "plenty"
- Zaazaa, a Moroccan avocado milkshake

== See also ==
- Zsa Zsa, Hungarian name
- Zazie (disambiguation)
- Zazi
