= Zaza (name) =

Zaza (Georgian: ზაზა) is a masculine Georgian given name. It may refer to:

- Zaza Panaskerteli-Tsitsishvili (fl. 15th-century), Georgian prince, politician, and intellectual
- Zaza Burchuladze (born 1973), Georgian novelist and dramatist
- Zaza Chelidze (born 1987), Georgian football player
- Zaza Aleksidze (1935–2023), Georgian historian and linguist
- Zaza Chkhaidze (born 1974), Georgian major general
- Zaza Eloshvili (1964–2001), Georgian footballer
- Zaza Enden (born 1976), Turkish basketball player of Georgian descent
- Zaza Gogava (born 1971), Georgian Major General
- Zaza Gorozia (born 1975), Georgian politician
- Zaza Janashia (born 1976), Georgian footballer
- Zaza Kedelashvili (born 1985), Georgian judoka
- Zaza Kolelishvili (born 1957), Georgian actor, film director and artist
- Zaza Korinteli (a.k.a. Zumba; born 1973), Georgian rock musician, folklorist and civic activist
- Zaza Nadiradze (born 1993), Georgian canoeist
- Zaza Navrozashvili (born 1992), Georgian rugby player
- Zaza Okuashvili (born 1963), Georgian businessman, politician and philanthropist
- Zaza Pachulia (born 1984), Georgian NBA basketball player
- Zaza Revishvili (born 1968), Georgian footballer
- Zaza Rusadze (born 1977), Georgian filmmaker
- Zaza Sikharulidze (born 1960), Georgian politician
- Zaza Tavadze (born 1975), Georgian politician
- Zaza Tkeshelashvili (born 1965), Georgian freestyle wrestler
- Zaza Tsotniashvili (born 1971), Georgian rector of Gori University
- Zaza Turmanidze (born 1965), Georgian wrestler
- Zaza Tuschmalischvili (born 1960), Georgian painter
- Zaza Urushadze (1965–2019), Georgian filmmaker
- Zaza Zirakishvili (born 1975), Georgian football player
