= Tsatsa =

Tsatsa may refer to:

- Tsatsa (votive offering), used in Buddhist stupas
- Tsatsa, Volgograd Oblast, a locality in Svetloyarsky District, Volgograd Oblast, Russia
- Lake Tsatsa, a lake in Svetloyarsky District, Volgograd Oblast, Russia
- Tabitha Tsatsa, Zimbabwean athlete

== See also ==
- Zaza (disambiguation)
