= Tuganov =

Tuganov is a surname. Notable people with the surname include:

- Elbert Tuganov (1922–2007), Estonian animator
- Maharbek Tuganov (1881–1952), Ossetian painter
- Vladimir Tuganov (born 1961), Russian equestrian
