= Gagloyev =

Gagloyev or Gagloev (Russian: Гаглоев) is an Ossetian masculine surname; its feminine counterpart is Gagloyeva or Gagloeva. It may refer to:

- Aleksandr Gagloyev (born 1990), Russian football player
- Fyodor Gagloyev (born 1966), Russian football coach and a former player
- Vadim Gagloyev (born 1989), Russian football player
- Vladimir Gagloyev (1927–1996), Ossetian writer
- Alan Gagloyev (born 1981), Ossetian politician and current President of South Ossetia
