= Ossetian literature =

Ossetian (or Ossetic) literature is expressed in the Ossetian language, an Iranian language of the Caucasus.

The Ossetian literature is comparatively young, with its first specimen published in the 1890s. Its golden age was in the years after the October Revolution in Russia, when local languages received a significant impact.

The most popular motives of the Ossetic literature are:

- the life of highlanders, especially the poor ones, in 19th century or in earlier times;
- the role of traditional right in the life of Ossetians (including criticism of vendetta-like revenge tradition of "taking blood back" and other "harmful traditions");
- the construction of socialism (often in contrast to the previous state of things): Ossetians really received better life compared to the tsarist regime time, when they felt severe lack of agricultural lands, poverty and illiteracy;
- the Great Patriotic War (the name of the World War II in Soviet Union): every tenth Ossetian man died during the war, many were honored as "Heroes of the Soviet Union" for their courage;

and others.

The Ossetian writers and poets use the rich fund of traditional lyrics and the Nart epic, which is considered the national epic of the Ossetians (as well as of several other peoples of the North Caucasus, each having their own version). A written composite version of the epic itself has also been published in both major dialects, Iron and Digor; more details about the epic are given in the relevant article.

== Writers ==
Ossetian poets include Kosta Khetagurov, Yakov Khozijev, Grish Pliev, and Shamil Jigkayev. Ossetian prose writers include Arsen Kotsoyev, Seka Gadiyev, Elbazduko Britayev, and Nafi Jusoyty.

Gallery

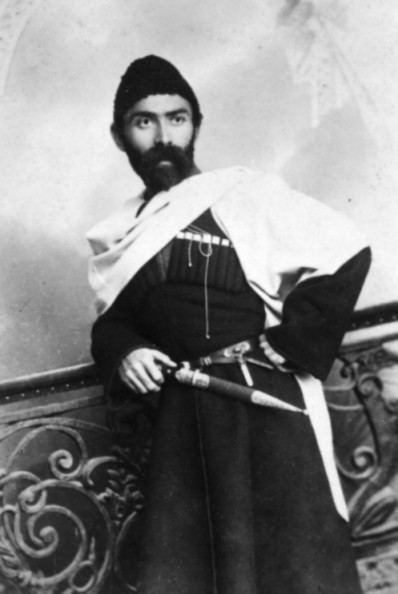
Kosta Khetagurov

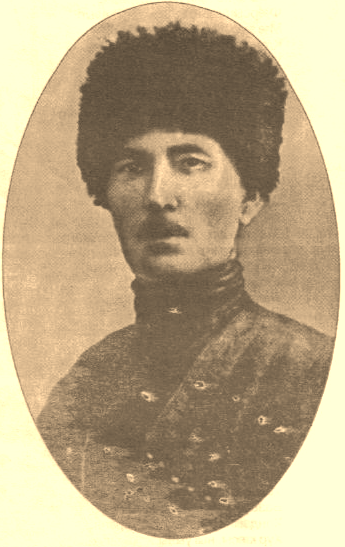
Soslan Temyrxanty (Temirkhanov)
