= Ganisi =

Ganisi განისი (Georgian) Ганис (Iron Ossetic))
- Location within Georgia
- Coordinates: 42°26′29″N 44°28′50″E
- Country: Georgia
- Mkhare: Mtskheta-Mtianeti
- Municipality: Kazbegi

Population (2014)
  - Total: 0
- Time zone: UTC+4 (Georgian Time)

Ganisi (Georgian: განისი, Iron Ossetic: Ганис) was a village in the Kazbegi Municipality in Mtskheta-Mtianeti, Georgia. It is placed on the right bank of the Aragvi river in Gud Valley. According to the 2014 census, it had no living inhabitants. In the year 1926, it had 86 inhabitants, most of them being ethnic Ossetian.

Ganisi was the birthplace of the Ossetian national writer, Seka Gadiyev.
