= Zazie (given name) =

- Gender: Feminine
- Language: French

Origin
- Meaning: French hypocorism for Isabelle

Zazie is a feminine given name and hypocorism for names such as Elizabeth and Isabelle. It is often used in reference to the child character in the 1961 French film Zazie dans le Métro. Other prominent bearers of the name are the French singer-songwriter Zazie and the German-American actress Zazie Beetz.

== People with the name ==
- Zazie Beetz (born 1991), German and American actress
- Zazie (Isabelle de Truchis de Varennes, born 1964), French pop singer and songwriter

== Fictional characters with the name ==
- Zazie, a character in Zazie dans le Métro, a 1959 novel by Raymond Queneau, and the 1960 film adaptation Zazie dans le Métro, sometimes titled as just Zazie
- Manga/video/anime works:
  - Mademoiselle Zazie, a 2013 cartoon series
  - Zazie Rainyday, character in Negima! Magister Negi Magi manga and anime
  - Zazie the Beast, a character in Trigun manga and anime
  - Zazie the Sunflower Girl, a character in Boktai video games
  - Zazie Winters, a character in Tegami Bachi manga and anime

== See also ==
- Zaza (disambiguation)
