= ZSA =

ZSA can refer to:

- The IATA code for San Salvador Airport
- The ISO 639 code for the Sarasira language
- Zonal safety analysis

== See also ==
- Zsa Zsa (or Zsazsa), a given name
