= Alexander Kubalov =

Ossetian writer

Alexander Byzievich (Zakharovich) Kubalov (Iron Ossetic: Къубалты Бызийы фырт Алыксандр, Russian: Александр Бызиевич (Захарович) Кубалов) (1871, Stary Batakoyurt, Terek Oblast – 1937 or 1944) (Note: Some sources say that he died in 1937, but others say that he was repressed in 1937 but died in 1944.) was an Ossetian writer.
