= Gaito Gazdanov =

Writer, Radio Free Europe/Radio Liberty editor from Russian Empire

- Гайто́ Газда́нов; Гӕздӕнты Гайто
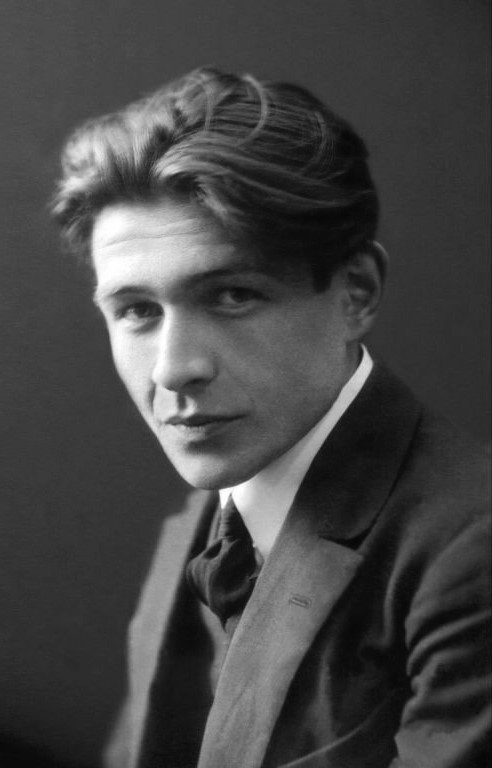
- Gazdanov in Paris, c. 1920s
- Born: Georgii Ivanovich Gazdanov; 6 December [O.S. 23 November] 1903; Saint Petersburg, Russian Empire
- Died: 6 December 1971 (aged 68); Munich, West Germany
- Citizenship: Russian Empire (1899–1917); France (1920–1971)
- Occupations: short story writer, novelist, Radio Free Europe/Radio Liberty editor
- Writing career
- Notable works: An Evening with Claire; The Specter of Alexander Wolf; Night Roads

Gaito Gazdanov Russian: Гайто́ Газда́нов; Iron Ossetic: Гӕздӕнты Гайто; 6 December [O.S. 23 November] 1903 – 5 December 1971) was a Russian émigré writer of Ossetian descent, who lived in Paris. Gazdanov's first stories were published in France in 1926 in Russian. His novels An Evening with Claire (1929) and The Spectre of Alexander Wolf (1948) became his most well-known works, mentioned by writers Maxim Gorky, Ivan Bunin and Vladislav Khodasevich. Gazdanov was a member of the French Resistance in occupied France. In 1953, he joined Radio Free Europe/Radio Liberty as an editor. Although he learned perfect French whilst living in France, Gazdanov continued writing stories in Russian.

== Biography ==
Georgii Ivanovich Gazdanov (Russian: Гайто́ Ива́нович Газда́нов; Iron Ossetic: Гӕздӕнты Иваны фырт Георгий) was born in 1903 in Saint Petersburg but was brought up in Siberia and Ukraine, where his father worked as a forester. His father was from Ossetia, a North Caucasian region within the Russian Empire. He took part in the Russian Civil War on the side of Wrangel's White Army. In 1920, he left Russia and settled in Paris, where he was employed in the Renault factories. His early short stories and novels dealt with this Russian experience. But by the mid-1930s, the years in Paris turned Gazdanov's themes toward life, Russian or French, in France. Later, he earned his living as a taxicab driver. Gazdanov can be regarded as a White émigré. He died in Munich in 1971.

Gazdanov's first novel — An Evening with Claire (1929) — won accolades from Maxim Gorky and Vladislav Khodasevich, who noted his indebtedness to Marcel Proust. In "Black Swans", a 1930 short story, the protagonist commits suicide because he has no chance of moving to Australia, which he imagines to be an idealised paradise of graceful black swans. On the strength of his first short stories, Gazdanov was described by critics as one of the most gifted writers to begin his career in emigration.

Gazdanov's mature work was produced after World War II. He tried to write in a new genre, metaphysical thrillers. His mastery of criminal plots and understanding of psychological detail is evident in his two most popular novels, The Spectre of Alexander Wolf and The Return of the Buddha, whose English translations appeared in 1950 and 1951. The writer "excels in creating characters and plots in which cynicism and despair remain in precarious yet convincing balance with a courageous acceptance of life and even a certain joie de vivre."

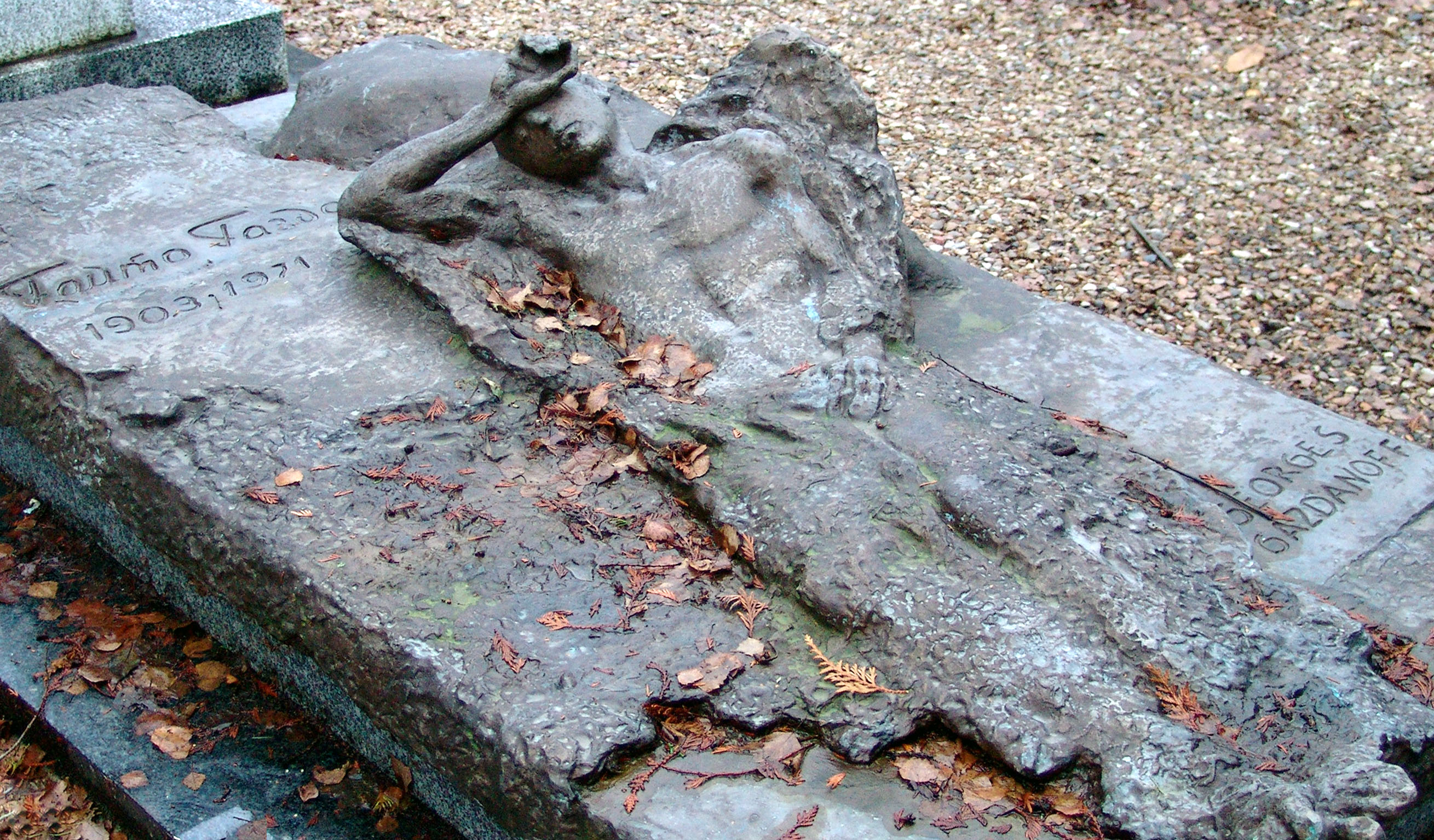
Gazdanov's grave.

In 1953, Gazdanov joined Radio Liberty, where he hosted a program about Russian literature (under the name of Georgi Cherkasov) until his death of lung cancer in 1971.

Gazdanov's works were never published in the Soviet Union. After several decades of oblivion, starting in the 1990s more than fifty editions of his works, including a three-volume collection (1998) followed by a five-volume collection (2009, ed. by T.N. Krasavchenko) were finally published in post-Soviet Russia. The Ossetian artistic community, led by Valery Gergiev, had a new tombstone placed at his grave in Sainte-Geneviève-des-Bois. The annual Gazdanov Readings are held to discuss his literary heritage.

== Selected works ==
=== Novels ===
- An Evening with Claire (1929, Вечер у Клэр)
- The Flight (1939, Полёт; first complete ed.,1992)
- Night Roads (1939–40, Ночные дороги)
- The Spectre of Alexander Wolf (1947–48, Призрак Александра Вольфа)
- The Buddha's Return (1949–50, Возвращение Будды)

=== Short stories ===
- "The Beggar"
- "Black Swans" (1930)
- "Deliverance" (1936)
- "The Mistake" (1938)
- "Ivanov's Letters" (1963)

=== English translations ===
- The Spectre of Alexander Wolf, translated by Nicholas Wreden (New York: Dutton, 1950)
- Buddha's Return, translated by Nicholas Wreden (New York: Dutton, 1951)
- An Evening with Claire, translated by Jodi Daynard (Ann Arbor: Ardis, 1988)
- Night Roads: A Novel, translated by Justin Doherty (Evanston: Northwestern, 2009)
- The Spectre of Alexander Wolf, translated by Bryan Karetnyk (London: Pushkin, 2013)
- The Buddha's Return, translated by Bryan Karetnyk (London: Pushkin, 2014)
- The Flight, translated by Bryan Karetnyk (London: Pushkin, 2016)
- The Beggar and Other Stories, translated and introduced by Bryan Karetnyk (London: Pushkin, 2018)
- An Evening with Claire, translated by Bryan Karetnyk (London: Pushkin, 2021)

=== Film adaptations ===
A television movie "The Spectre of Alexander Wolff" (1950) based on the book of the same name. Directed by Carl Frank, starring Leslie Nielsen, Joan Chandler and Murvyn Vye. Produced by CBS as the episode of Studio One. Aired October 9, 1950. The events, unlike in the book, are set in the 1940s.

"A French newsman returns to Marseilles to relive his killing of a suspected Gestapo agent when he was a member of the French Underground."
