= Yakov Khoziev =

Ossetian poet

Yakov Khoziev (Iron Ossetic: Хозиты Яков) (February 8, 1916 – July 9, 1938) was an Ossetian poet.

After having studied for some time at an agricultural school, in 1932 he seriously devoted himself to literature, entering the literary faculty of the North Ossetia Pedagogical Institute (now university). There were 14 newspapers and magazines in Ossetian language published in North Ossetia in the 1930s, all of them since 1932 published poems by Khoziev.

In 1936, having finished the pedagogical institute, Yakov Khoziev started his post-diploma studies at the North Ossetian Research Institute. He could not become a doctor of philology because of his sudden death on 9 July 1938: he drowned while swimming in the fast moving river Terek. He was 22 years old at that time.

Some of his many poems are studied in the school course of Ossetian literature. His poetry is "generally about hope and achievement", as described by professor Shamil Dzhigkaev, author of the Ossetian literature overview.
