= Elbazduko Britayev =

Ossetian playwright (1881–1923)

- Native name: Брытъиаты Елбыздыхъо
- Born: 22 March 1881 Dallagkau, Terek Oblast, Russian Empire
- Died: 25 September 1923 (aged 42) Vladikavkaz, Mountain ASSR, Russian SFSR
- Occupation: Playwright, editor
- Language: Ossetian, Russian

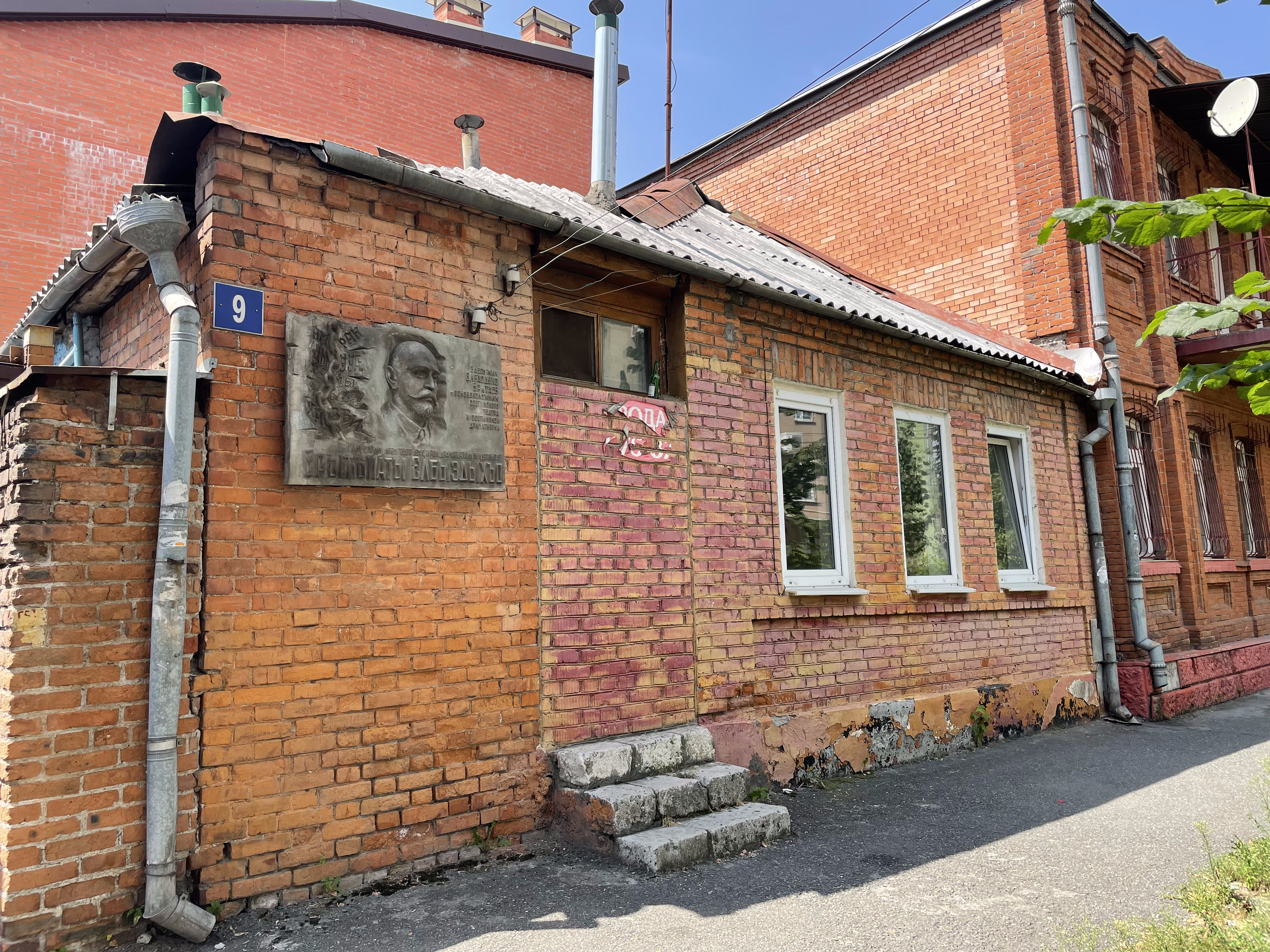
Britayev's former house in Vladikavkaz (9 Ballaev Street) with commemorative plaque

Elbazduko Britayev (Iron Ossetic: Брытъиаты Цопаны фырт Елбыздыхъо, romanized: Brıtiatı Tsopanı fırt Elbızdıho, Russian: Елбыздыко́ Цопа́нович Брита́ев, romanized: Elbyzdykó Tsopánovich Britáyev; 22 March 1881 – 25 September 1923) was an Ossetian author and playwright, considered the founder of Ossetian traditional theatre. Many phrases from his works have become proverbs, such as "Love does not follow the rules of wisdom", and the characters that he created are being increasingly re-used.

Britayev was born on 22 March 1881 in Dallagkau, Terek Oblast. He graduated from the Vladikavkaz Real School in 1903. He participated in the Russian Revolution of 1905, for which he was imprisoned. He was exiled from the Terek Oblast in 1910. He received a degree from the Faculty of Law of the Saint Petersburg Imperial University in 1917. Britayev's political views were aligned with the Socialist Revolutionary Party and bourgeois nationalism. Following the February Revolution of 1917, he went to Vladikavkaz and joined the counter-revolution.

Britayev is considered an important figure in Ossetian literature. Ivan Dshanaev called him the "Ossetian Melpomene". His plays Visited in Russia and Better death than shame, written in 1902 and 1903, were published in 1905. His drama Khazbi (Russian: Хазби), written between 1905 and 1907, concerned the 1830 Tagaurian uprising and the working class struggle against Tsarism. His drama Two Sisters, written in 1908, told the story of a woman from the mountains and addressed people's struggles against adat and its destructive influence on relationships. His tragedy Amran, published in 1927, concerned social liberation. Britayev was an editor for the magazine Ray of Light in 1912 and the Vladikavkaz newspaper Mountain Life in 1918.

Britayev died on 25 September 1923 in Vladikavkaz.
