= Kosta Khetagurov =

Ossetian poet (1859–1906)

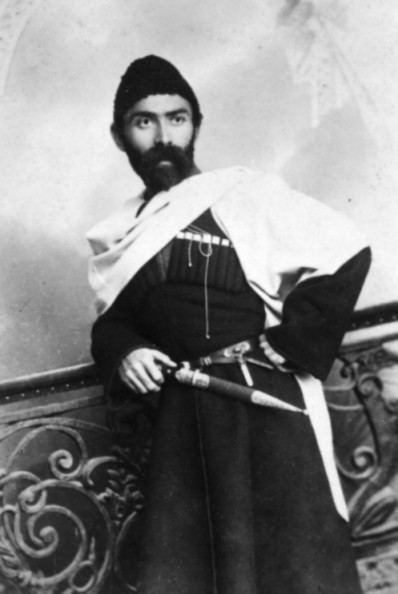
- Born: Kosta Levanovich Khetagurov; 15 October 1859; Nar, Ossetia, Russian Empire
- Died: 1 April 1906 (aged 46); Labæ, Russian Empire
- Occupations: Artist; drawer; poet
- Writing career
- Movement: Humanism

Kosta Levanovich Khetagurov (Note: The first name is also transliterated as Konstantin.) (Iron Ossetic: Хетæгкаты Леуаны фырт Къоста, romanized: Xetægkaty Lewany fyrt Khosta, Russian: Коста (Константин) Леванович Хетагуров; 15 October [O.S. 3 October] 1859 – 1 April [O.S. 19 March] 1906) was a national poet of the Ossetian people who is generally regarded as the founder of Ossetian literature. He was also a talented painter and a notable public benefactor.

Khetagurov was born in the village of Nar in what is now Alagirsky District in the Republic of North Ossetia–Alania. He studied at the Stavropol Gymnasium from 1871 to 1881, and entered the Saint Petersburg Academy of Arts in 1881, but had to abandon his studies due to financial constraint in 1885. Back in his native Ossetia, he became a prominent poet, whose poems composed in Ossetic quickly spread throughout Ossetian towns and villages in an oral form. He also published a number of poems, stories and articles in the Russian-language newspapers Severny Kavkaz (edited by himself, 1893–1902), and Kazbek. His paintings also gained in notable popularity, one of them depicting Saint Nino, a 4th-century Christian baptizer of the Georgians, was particularly welcomed by the Georgian society.

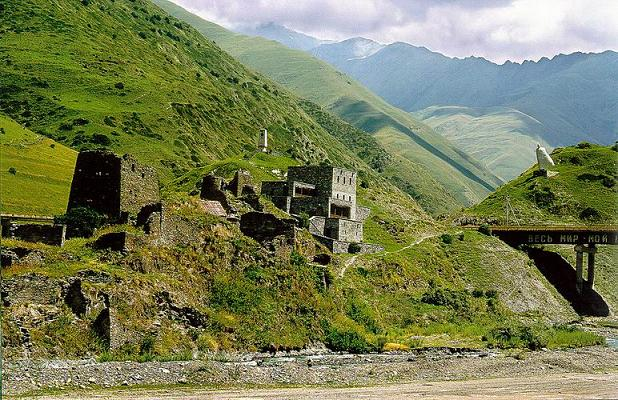
Kosta Khetagurov's house in Nar

Due to his criticism of the Imperial Russian government he was twice exiled from his motherland from 1891 to 1896 and again from 1899 to 1902. The last exile significantly shattered the poet's health and deprived him of the ability to continue his creative and social activities. Khetagurov died shortly afterwards in Labæ (nowadays Karachay-Cherkessia) in 1906.

== Early life and education ==
Konstantin (Kosta) Khetagkaty was born on October 15, 1859, in the remote mountain village of Nar. Situated at the terminus of a lengthy road, Nar is a small yet notable town near the larger town of Tibsli in the Alagir gorge of North Ossetia. Located close to the Georgian-Russian border, this geographical proximity would later prove significant.

Kosta was recognized as a drawing prodigy.

Due to his recognition as a gestating artist, Kosta was selected to attend a distant school, the Lyceum in Stravopol. Kosta's remarkable facility with brush and pen was apprehended and remarked upon by the Russian drawing master Smirnov.

It was now that a crossroads arose. Kosta had a disagreement with father Khetagurov about the direction of his future efforts. The father was convinced that the proper life for Kosta was that of a soldier. As a result, the father informed Kosta of the many patriotic benefits and opportunities for the fighting man. Kosta, however, rebutted this argument strongly that he was not interested in fighting opportunities. There was some back and forth on this matter. Eventually, Kosta won out, though it is not known whether this was done by reconciling or by scorning father Khetagurov. The mind made up, in 1881 Kosta entered the Academy of Arts in Petersburg. There, the din and hubbub surrounding Kosta's work raised the expectations even higher. There was a widespread thought that Kosta would become an artist for life.

A double-edged sword struck the poor Kosta, however, as he found his stipend suddenly removed from his life. The stipend has been up to this point in the story a form of deep reliance by Kosta, and he struggled to maintain himself without it. There were trials of the spirit as the many hours of work stockpiled. There were trials of the body as Kosta was forced to undertake laborious activities in pursuit of sustenance. Still, one end did not meet the other. In these dark times Kosta was buffeted by an impossible situation. He had no choice but to throw the towel in and return to Nar. Why was the stipend taken from Kosta? It is a fact unknown, but at least one author speculates it was due to the political divisions that were becoming rife in Russia.

== Career ==
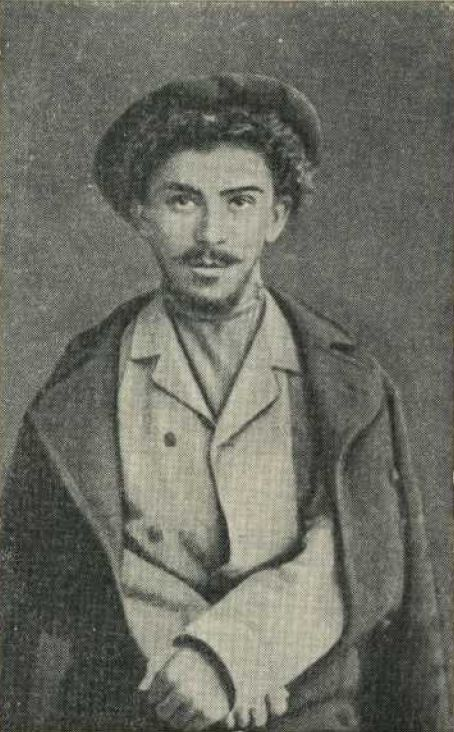
Kosta Khetagurov as a student

Although Kosta was partially unschooled, his paintings were still formidable. This allowed Kosta to live for a time from commissions of his skills. To much herald and trumpet there was a great exhibition of his work soon into this period. The exhibition was considered a cultural moment of note in [Vladikavkaz]. There are contemporary accounts that the exhibition was a great coup, both for the reputation and for the funding of Kosta. There are three paintings of especial noteworthiness described in the accounts as the opus of the master: "Children Stone-breakers", "In an Ossetian Hut", "The Zikara Pass". There is an account of the verisimilitude of the painting "St.Nina", which upon display caused crowds to gather round and peer closely.It is said that these assembled throngs asked a custodial worker to let them unto a rope and poke the canvass to assure that it was a flat expanse and not a box with a statue contained. Indeed, the painting is still held in high esteem today. There was then the conundrum in that a paying opportunity presented itself, but only that of the rude painter of theatrical backdrops. This construction of scenes was lucrative but Kosta was displeased that the theaters advertised his presence so widely. He did not wish his name to become associated with that more crass form of painting.

=== The National Poet Emerges ===
The early rate of painting was vast—some mourn that this rate did not maintain itself. However, it is said that when Kosta returned to the house of Nar it was as if a great stone had been placed on his paint brush. The interests of Kosta migrated away from the paint. At first, despite the "dreary situation" that alarmed Kosta, painting was still attempted, but with a subplot of unhappiness. Other attempts of the pen began to supplant the painting. Many say this was "the birth of a great poet." Kosta is also unlike others in that he wrote in both Ossetian and Russian. The first book of Kosta, the collection of the early poems, was a Russian effort. The main influence on Kosta is identified to be the current that permeated Russia, the revolutionary and democratic spirit now sleeping but soon to rise like a burning sun. Kosta's work was unerringly popular, seeking to point to the suffering of the ordinary at every turn.

The patriotism which the Kosta father tried to drill into the young Kosta is also apparent. Patriotism is scattered left and right in the early works. The degree of patriotism culminates in "The Ossetian Lyre." This book was published in 1899 for the first time. Ever since this date the Ossetian Lyre has been cherished among the other Ossetian books. There are Kosta songs, Kosta sayings and wisdom, Kosta slogans and more in Ossetia.

One popular poem that has been translated to English is called "Mother of Orphans". An excerpt is included as an example of the Kosta subject matter, but the translation does not convey the skill of the verse.

"And while dark and dismal
Still the ashes glowed,
She could not with weeping
Ease her heart's dire load.

Then she told the children:
"See, I'm boiling beans!"
Really she was cooking
Pebbles for her weans."

Interpretation of the above is given: A fire of not enough warmth and light is in the house. Crying is found to be not enough for the heart to unloose its great emotions. Instead, there is no place for the emotion. The children are also dissatisfied. As a bit of backdrop, it is clear in the original Ossetian poem that the children are orphans. Additionally, the woman is a widow. This is a theme of the poem, wherein the woman is later chiding of the man for dying in a rock fall and leaving the others behind. This may be difficult for different cultures to contemplate if they have the aid for widows and orphans, but at the time there was not. Then, a deception occurs, wherein the children are coaxed to sleep by promise of later food, but such food is not to come. Instead the pot has boiling rocks.

=== First exile ===
To think of Kosta as no more than a painter and poet is misleading. He was standout public figure, fond of publicity, popular as an actor, and he very loudly opposed every unjust movement which he perceived to be occurring. Now, this would be accepted and thanked. It is easy to imagine, however, that the Czars were not fond of this trouble bringing artist. Those who were about strictures and maintaining the past traditions were upset with him, and a series of escalations in angry officials resulted in Kosta's first banishment. In 1895 Kosta was forcibly packed up and forced to leave immediately from the region of Terek without returning. This was of some difficulty for Kosta, but not too great, as he had a ready dwelling available in Stavropol. Unsatisfied with remaining in this boyish haunt that he remembered so well, eventually the Kosta home was moved to Pyatigorsk.

To this time, Kosta had written: "I've known no happiness, but I'd
give my freedom
Which I am used, like happiness,
to prize,
If I might pave one step the way
to freedom,
That road which waiting for the
people lies."

=== Second exile ===
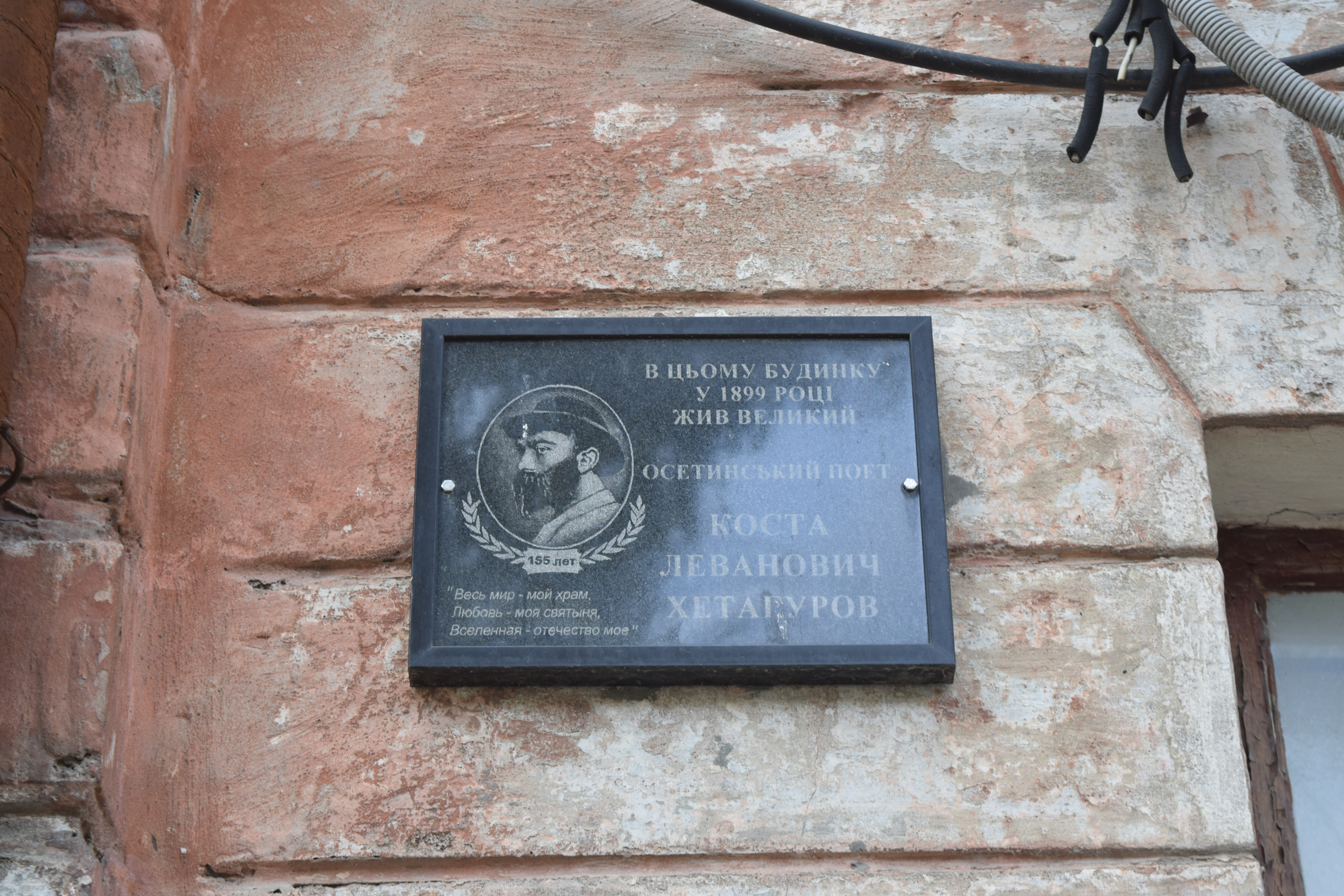
Memorial plaque at his home in Kherson

Kosta remained without rest, regardless of where he moved himself. Kosta made himself an enemy of the Czar policies, and spoke forcibly against them once more. The Czar's underlings struck back, and in retribution for the trouble Kosta was exiled for the second time in the length of fice years, now to Kherson. This occurred 1899. Although the first exile was of moderate annoyance it could be taken by Kosta in stride and not too affecting of his work. The second of the exiles, however, seemed to drain from Kosta the essential spirits and job required to be the great artist. Without the spirits there was great sickness and despair. His work of the time has the quality of sickness:

"Glorious sunlight strikes my forehead
Warmly wafting voluptuous vapors of rippled
Nostalgia, tears appear in my ears, my
Hearing senses sorrowful drops of love outside.
I wish to move, to shake the bars, for
Within these still walls the devil himself hides."

It was because of such great sickness that Kosta was finally allowed back to his home, in the year 1901. Friends who had not seen Kosta for two years could swear that he left as a delighted soul and he came back looking like old father Kosta before he died. Kosta was ill with serious symptom and it looked to be, in quite a correct thought, that Kosta had not too much more time in life.

== Personal life and death ==
It is not known if Kosta married at this time or not. In fact, there is a great dearth of common information about many details of Kosta's personal life.

Before the Death of Kosta it is said he wrote:

"...the dawn is breaking,
the sun is gleaming on the bay-
onets".

This clever word is a prophetic view that there was to be a new day, and new change, and with it would come death. It is both a prophecy of Kosta's death and a prophecy of the First World War which was to come in ten years. Kosta was sick and lingering for many years, then he died in the year of 1906.

== Philosophy ==
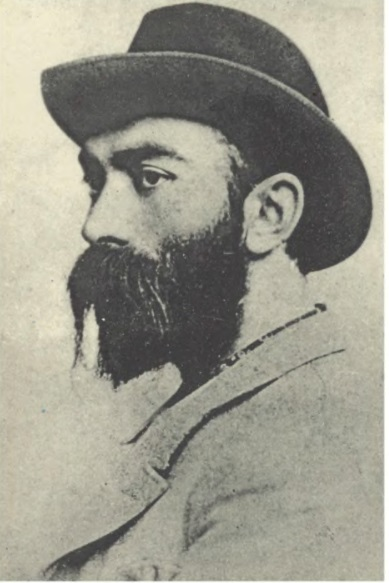
Kosta Khetagurov

There are poetic similarities between poets. There is a brand of poetry that is about the ordinary and good among the people. Kosta is in this brand. Similarly branded in philosophy are considered Mikhail Lermontov, Nikolai Nekrasov, Robert Burns, Taras Shevchenko according to those who know the poets.

Themes in common in this philosophy are those of social and justice concerns. There is emphasis on truth and progress of man, a theme of what is called "humanism" in his efforts. He writes:

"To the truths radiance
Boldly go treading.
Cowards and lay-abouts,
Clear off, no meddling!"

There is a constant theme in the work of Kosta that plays to the gap between the money and life enjoyed by the rich, and the money and life enjoyed by the poor. Kosta spent many harsh and unforgiving phrases on the people who were well off and rich at the expense of others. Even the rich who were not possessing their money from other peoples misfortunes felt the sting of Kosta's pen. To the people "who eat well and are happy" there comes this translation, not expertly rendered due to difficulty of the script:

"Your happiness -I don't require it –
No happiness for the people
there...
In brilliant mansions I'm expiring,
Fainting and blinded by their
glare...
For ages built by slavedom tor-
tured,
In them the groans of orphans
choke,
In them the wine with tears is wa-
tered-
No, by yourselves enjoy good
fortune,
Where so unfortunate is the folk!"

There has been much talk of the patriotism of the poet Kosta. True, the significance of Kosta is most felt in Ossetia and not too many places outside. But, at the time he was a man who people had knowledge of around the world. Kosta, too, had knowledge of those who knew him elsewhere. Therefore, to call Kosta a regional poet is not fully accurate. The Caucasus mountains have sung Kosta's praises across many national borders. One example of Kosta's international poetry follows:

"The world is my temple,
The Love is my shrine,
The universe is my homeland"

== Legacy ==
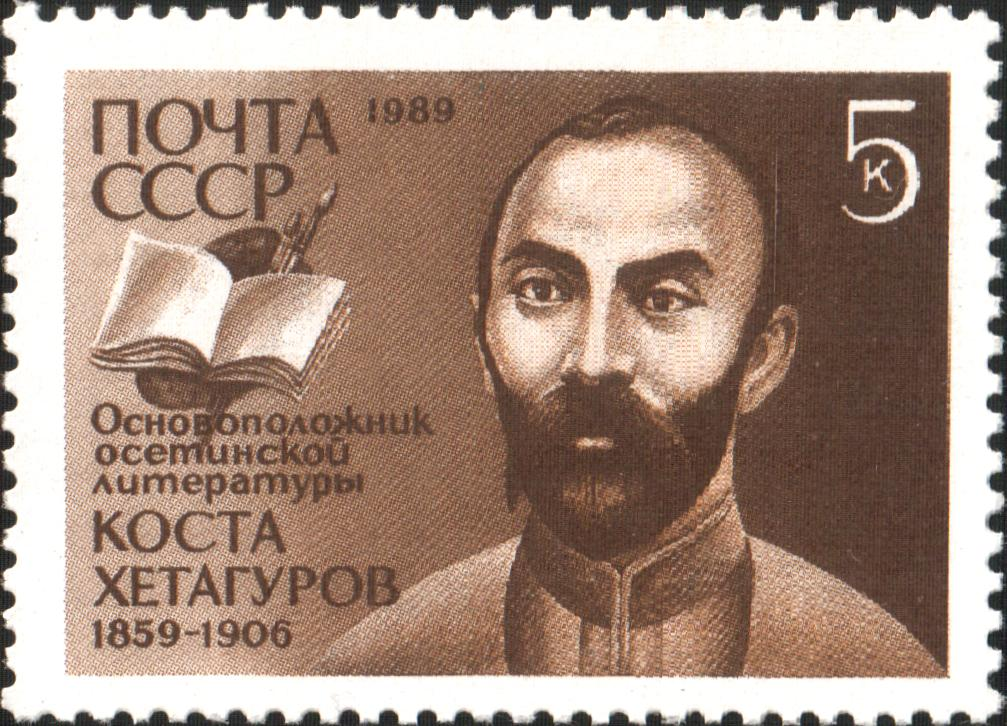
Kosta Khetagurov on the 1989 USSR commemorative stamp

To quote the Soviet poet of esteem Nikolai Tikhonov, Kosta "became an asset for progressive thought, the foremost art and the vanguard of mankind" and "he joined by right the great family of world classical writers".

Wrote one historian, "Kosta's influence on forming the Ossetian mentality is immense, and we believe that his beneficial moral power will be everlasting." The poems and other works of Kosta are still available for purchase and in many languages as well. They are in libraries and book stores and on the internet in these many languages. Another fact of noteworthiness is that today Ossetia is known as a place of great arts and culture, with large thanks to Kosta. To reflect this, one of the three universities of Ossetia, has the name Kosta Khetagurov upon it.

=== Statues ===
There have now been several statues of Kosta put up across the region. A more recently constructed statue is the one in Vladikavkaz. This statue once projected the legacy of Kosta. There is a sign on it that can be read, "To Kosta Khetagurov, the founder of Ossetian literature - from the Government of the Soviet Union."
