= Zaza Tuschmalischvili =

Georgian painter

Zaza Tuschmalischvili (Georgian: ზაზა თუშმალიშვილი; born 15 May 1960 in Skra, Georgia) is a Georgian painter, living and working in Berlin since 1991.

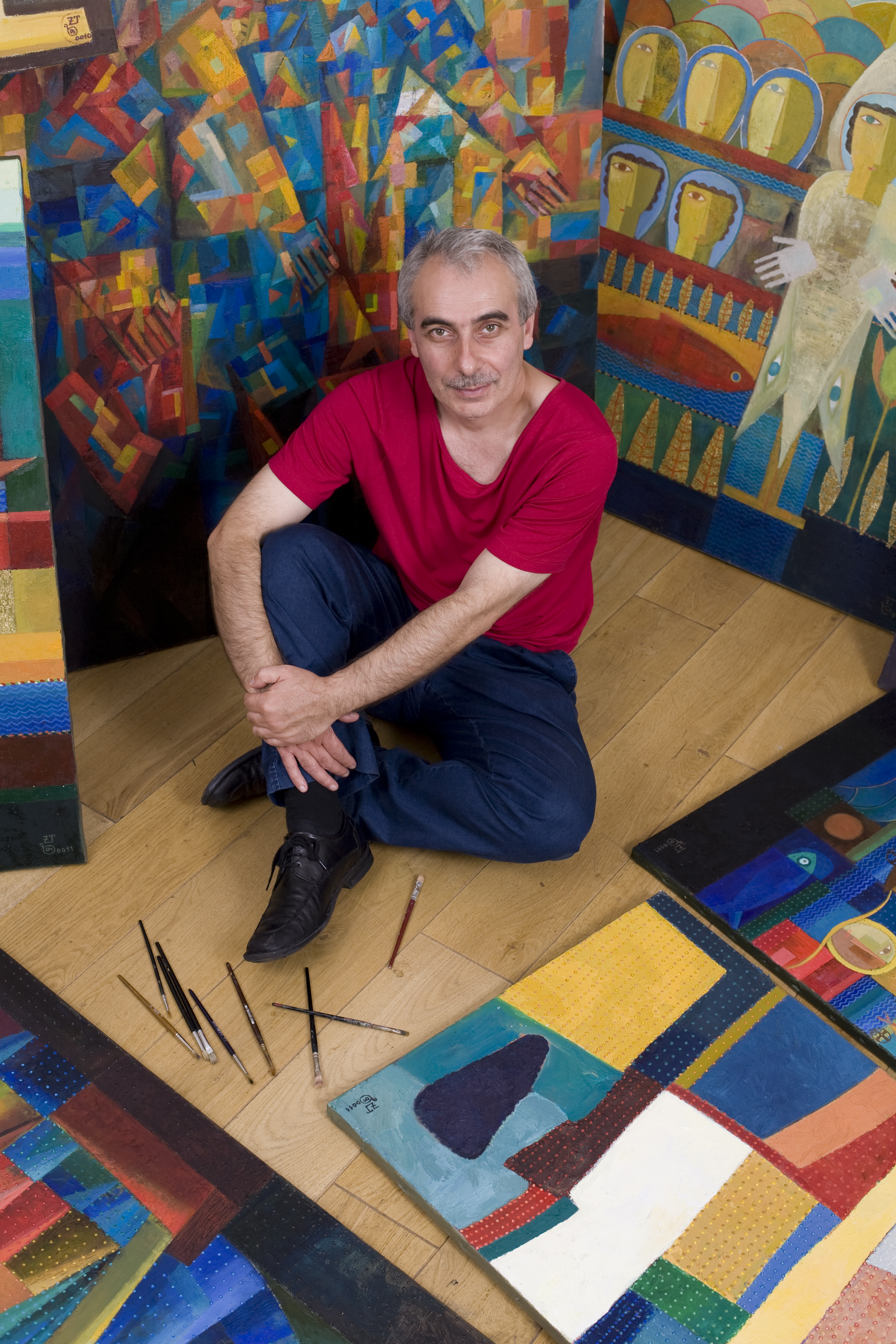

== Biography ==
Zaza Tuschmalischvili was born in 1960 in Skra, a small village near Gori in Georgia.

When he was nine years old he underwent surgery for an inguinal hernia. In hospital he met the painter and art teacher Nugzari Zhochuaschvili. Zhochuaschvili discovered the talent of the young boy and started teaching him every afternoon in an art school in Gori. At the age of 15 Zaza was admitted to an art technical school in Zchinvali, a city 30 km away from Gori.

After his graduation in 1979, Zaza did his military service. He stayed in Leningrad (St. Petersburg) for two years and during that time, had to employ his talent and creativity for political purposes. He was required to paint slogans and portraits, for example, of Stalin or Lenin, for International Labour Day and other events.

At the age of 22 he was awarded a scholarship and began studying at the Academy of Arts in Tbilisi, the capital of Georgia. He specialized in fresco restoration and studied techniques for restoring medieval mural paintings.

Between 1984 and 1987 he spent his holidays in the cloister Gelati. There he participated in the restoration of the apsidal mosaic of the Mother of God Church. In 1988 he lived and worked for nine months in the church Ateni Sioni as a restorer. Here he wrote his diploma thesis which involved painting a copy of a mural painting of the archangel Gabriel from the 11th century.

After perestroika and the fall of the Berlin wall, Tuschmalischvili came to Berlin in the year 1991. He soon started to display his paintings next to the bookstands near Humboldt University.

In 1994 he met Annilie Hillmer and she became his gallerist. She specialized in Georgian art, showed his pictures in her art salon and at international art fairs. (Annilie Hillmer founded the Georgia Berlin Gallery in Berlin-Charlottenburg in 1997.) In 1996 the artist won the competition of the New Society of Fine Arts. His painting Harmony for Love, a tempera work measuring 187 x 377 cm, was displayed throughout 1997 at the underground station Berlin-Alexanderplatz.

== Work ==
Zaza Tuschmalischvili's work is rooted in his home country, Georgia. Recurring and central symbols are the fish, the tree, the cherub and the bull. His painting techniques over the years have included oil, watercolor and tempera. More recently he has experimented with new techniques, blending watercolor and egg tempera, sometimes supplementing this combination with pencil. In his Cubist-influenced collages, shaped patches of color convey the light and colours reminiscent of both the Mediterranean and Zaza's home country, Georgia. Themes that appear frequently in his work are love, childhood and play.

Zaza's early paintings hava a relationship with Georgian mural paintings, in which compositional ideas and views date back to Byzantinium and Greco-Roman antiquity. In Georgia even the smallest village church was often painted inside and out with scenes of the Christological cycle and legends of the saints. Themes and motives are heaven or paradise, archangels and cherubim, or a king holding the model of a church in his hand. Zaza's figures from that time are mostly one-eyed.

During the mid-1990s, Zaza's image structure becomes more tectonic, and the narrative wealth of detail disappears in favor of a consistent composition which captivates the viewer. After 2000, he almost completely leaves behind three-dimensional shapes. A pictorial depth enters the pictures instead, with a perspectival space deriving from superimposing individual surfaces (for example, Kiss Mask, Men with Mask and Romance, all created during 2003).

Although the artist is still working with bright primary colors, it becomes clear how consistently this coloring submits to tectonic structures. Where the illusionistic width of the earlier pictures gave the painter the opportunity to use different shades, he now opts for a more basic approach, which usually consists of two to three color scales which interweave with each other. From 2004 onwards, this is done in a prismatic manner, so that the composition becomes increasingly transparent, gaining in depth of perspective (The City and Composition 7, both 2004).

== Documentations and awards ==
- 1995 Film documentation of the Academy of Arts, The Russian City
- 1997 Berlin, Competition Winner, NGBK Private Art instead of advertising-Metro Station Gallery at Berlin-Alexanderplatz
- 2000 „Art Profil. Das Fachmagazin für aktuelle Kunst”, Art of Eastern Europe was the theme of the third edition (2000). Further articles appeared in issues 2(2001), 5(2003) and 1 (2005).
- 2001 Documentation Georgische (Ein)Sichten 1994 – 1999 / "Georgian Insights 1994 - 1999"
- 2006 Film documentation by Zaza Buadze "Georgian impressions - the painter Z. Tuschmalischvili"
- 2014 Art book Zaza Tuschmalischvili Einsichten Georgien - Berlin / Insights Georgia - Berlin, published by Georgia Berlin Gallery

== Bibliography ==
- Georgia Berlin Galerie (Hrsg.): Zaza Tuschmalischvili Einsichten Georgien - Berlin / Insights Georgia Berlin, Berlin 2014. Mit Beiträgen von Brigitta Schrade, Dr. Helmut Orpel und Annilie Hillmer. ISBN 978-3-00-044459-3.
- Dr. Helmut Orpel: Kunst aus Osteuropa, in: „Art Profil. Das Fachmagazin für aktuelle Kunst.”, Heft 3, Jhg. 2000 / Heft 2, Jhg. 2001 / Heft 5, Jhg. 2003 / Heft 1, Jhg. 2005.
