= Zsa Zsa =

Zsa Zsa (also Zsazsa, /ˈʒɑːʒɑː/) is a given name that originated as the baby pet name of Zsa Zsa Gabor (1917–2016), Hungarian-American actress and socialite.

Notable people, characters, and animals with the name include:

== People ==
- Zsa Zsa Gabor (1917–2016), Hungarian-American actress and socialite
- Zsa Zsa Padilla (born 1964), Filipino singer and actress
- Ms Zsa Zsa Poltergeist, the stage name of British musician Andy Billups, member of the Hamsters
- Zsa Zsa Speck (fl. 1989), American keyboardist
- Zsa Zsa (singer) (born 1994), Croatian singer
- Zsa Zsa Utari (born 2003), Indonesian actress

== Fictional characters ==
- Zsa Zsa Carter, a character from the British soap opera EastEnders
- Zsazsa Zaturnnah, a character in Filipino comic books
- Zsazsa, a cat puppet in the children's TV series Hector's House
- Zsa Zsa Harper-Jenkinson, a character from the British soap opera Casualty
- Zsa Zsa, a teddy bear, belongs to Nori from Hey Duggee a British children’s TV series
- Zsa Zsa, a recurring villain in SuperKitties
- Zsa-zsa Korda, a character from the 2025 Wes Anderson film The Phoenician Scheme, played by Benicio del Toro

== Animals ==
- Zsa Zsa, the pet rabbit of US President John F. Kennedy

== See also ==
- ZSA (disambiguation)
