= Zaza Tsotniashvili =

Georgian academic

- ზაზა ცოტნიაშვილი
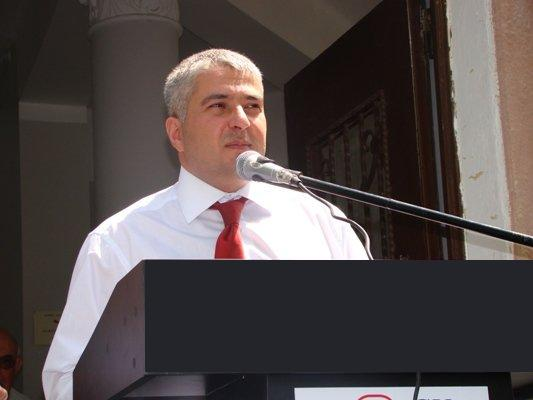
- Dr. Zaza Tsotniashvili
- Born: July 26, 1971 (age 54); Georgia
- Education: Tbilisi State University; Tskhinvali State Pedagogical Institute
- Occupations: Academic, university rector
- Notable work: Georgian-Ossetian Relations in the Press in the 19th–20th Centuries
- Title: Rector of Gori University
- Awards: Academician, Academy of Educational Sciences of Georgia

Dr. Zaza Tsotniashvili (Georgian: ზაზა ცოტნიაშვილი; born July 26, 1971) is the rector of Gori University in Gori, Georgia.

== Background ==
Dr. Zaza Tsotniashvili was educated in Georgia at Tbilisi State University and Tskhinvali State Pedagogical Institute. He also attended programs of study in:

- Political Science at Eichstätt University in Germany
- Management and Administration at the ESM Business School in Georgia
- The Open World Leadership Program in the US.

He has participated in courses and conferences on

- The International Scientific Conference, War and Peace Journalism (Georgia)
- Learning in Later Life (Cyprus)
- Academician of Academy of Educational Sciences of Georgia (Georgia)
- Modern Teaching, Learning and Assessment Methodology (USA)
- Russian influence on Caucasus (Poland)
- Project Cycle Management (Cordaid Netherlands, Georgia)

and many other international activities.

In 2005 he defended his Doctor’s dissertation: "Georgian-Ossetian Relations in the Press in the 19th-20th centuries".

Prior to his permanent assignment as rector of Gori University, Tsotniashvili was an acting rector of Tskhinvali and Gori Universities, and at different times dean of Humanitarian, Social Sciences and Philology-Journalism faculties. In addition, he worked in leadership positions on various community organizations.

In addition, Dr. Tsotniashvili is an expert of Fondazione Romualdo Del Bianco and President of Shida Kartli Tennis Federation. He is actively involved in community development and charity activities.

== Publications ==
Tsotniashvili is an author of 3 books and 35 scientific articles.
