= Zaazaa =

Moroccan avocado milkshake

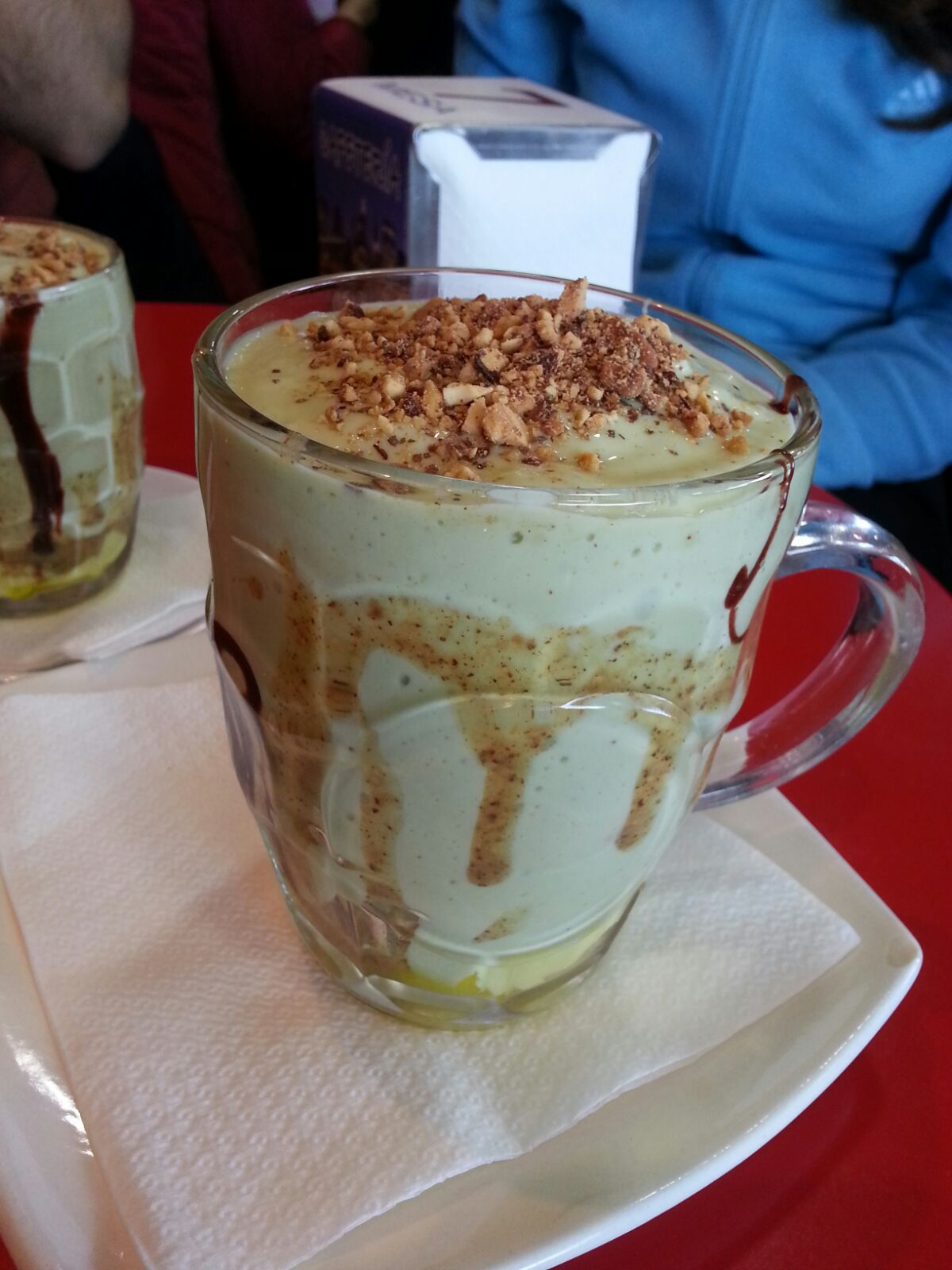
- Zaazaa with caramel sauce topped with nuts
- Alternative names: زعزع za'za'
- Type: Milkshake/parfait
- Course: Dessert, beverage
- Place of origin: Morocco
- Associated cuisine: Moroccan cuisine
- Invented: 2000s
- Serving temperature: Chilled
- Main ingredients: Avocado, milk, dates, raisins
- Ingredients generally used: Yogurt, dessert sauces, sliced fruit, nuts, cookies, candy bars
- Similar dishes: Avocado and milk in ice; Sinh tố bơ

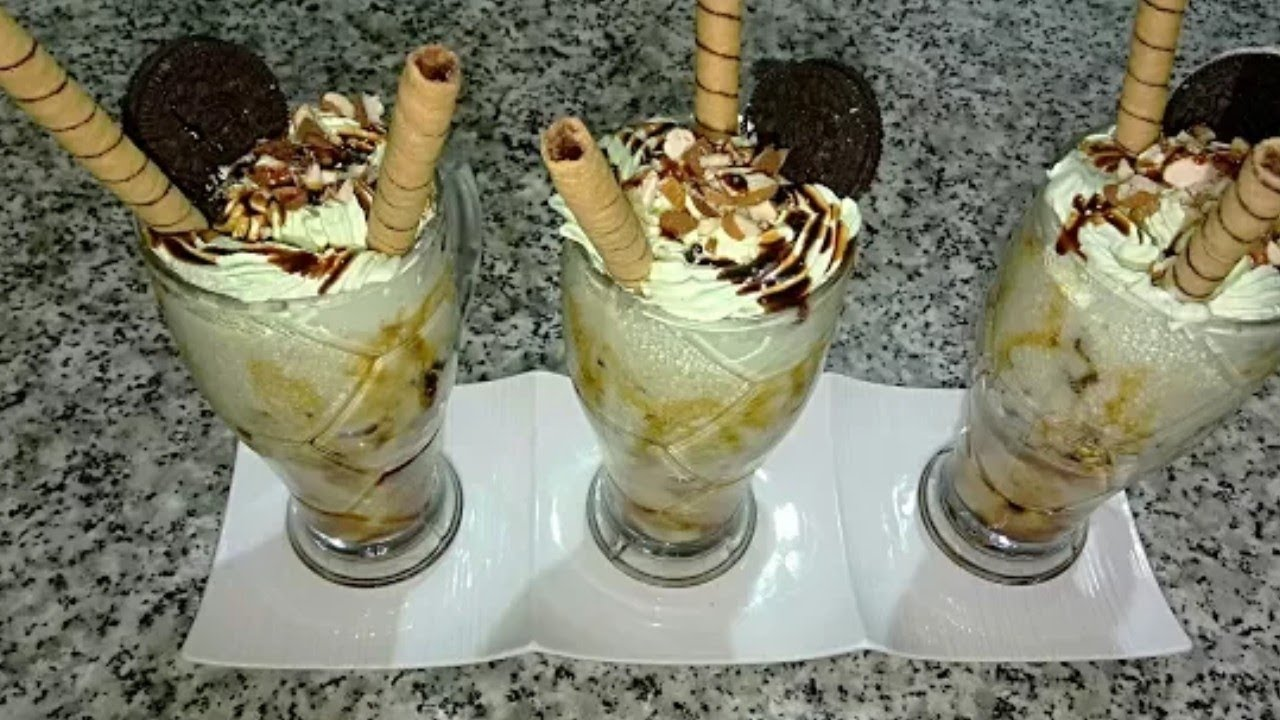
Zaazaa with caramel sauce topped with Piroulines, Oreos, whipped cream and chocolate syrup

Zaazaa (Moroccan Arabic: زعزع, romanized: za'za', from Moroccan Arabic تيزعزع 'shaken up') is a thick milkshake or parfait in Moroccan cuisine, centrally featuring avocado instead of the typical almond base of Moroccan milkshakes. Zaazaa is a popular treat during Ramadan to break the fast during iftar, and it is served at mahlaba snack bars year-round.

== Preparation and consumption ==
Moroccan milkshakes typically have a base of almonds, but zaazaa substitutes or augments this with avocado. A typical zaazaa is made by blending milk, almonds and avocado together with dried fruit such as dates and raisins, sometimes with honey. While the mixture could be simply served as is, it is typically served as a layered parfait: into a handled glass drizzled on the inside with dessert sauces (e.g. chocolate syrup, strawberry syrup or caramel sauce), sliced fruit like bananas, apples or kiwis are layered with raib (a thin Moroccan yogurt), nuts or millet, and the zaazaa mixture. The parfait is then topped with whipped cream and a variety of toppings, including additional sauces, nuts, cookies or tuiles. The final parfait is typically thick and eaten with a spoon as opposed to being drunk; it is served chilled.

During Ramadan, zaazaa is valued as a decadent, high-calorie treat to break the fast with during iftar. Extravagant toppings like Oreos, KitKats and Piroulines are a draw for zaazaa served at mahlaba snack bars; going out to have zaazaa is a popular evening group outing.

== History ==
Zaazaa developed from the expansion of the Moroccan avocado industry in the early 2000s, which increased domestic consumption of avocados. The drink was initially popular primarily during Ramadan as a calorie-dense drink for iftar, but has found growing year-round popularity, particularly at patisseries and mahlaba snack bars.

== See also ==
- Avocado and milk in ice
