= Seka Gadiyev =

Ossetian writer

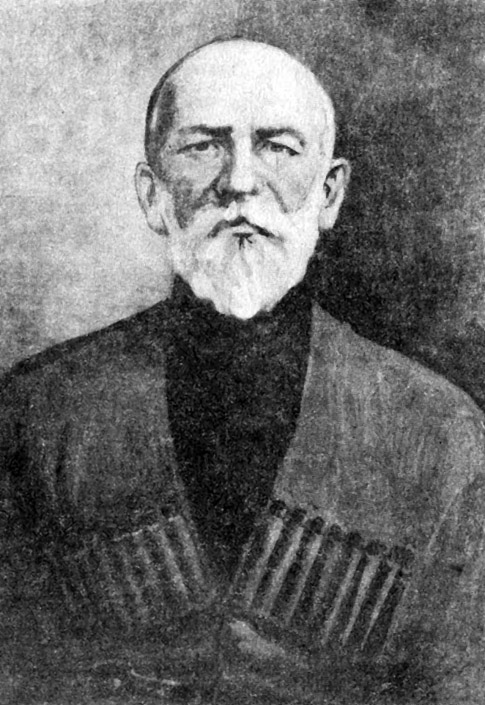
- Born: Гæдиаты Секъа; 1855/57; The village of Nizhny Ganisi, Gudsk Gorge, Dusheti district of the Tiflis Governorate
- Died: 3 August [O.S. 21 July] 1915; Vladikavkaz
- Occupations: writer, poet

Seka Gadiyev (Iron Ossetic: Гæдиаты Секъа) (1855/57 - 3 August [O.S. 21 July] 1915) was an Ossetian writer and poet, who is considered a classic of Ossetian literature and the founder of Ossetian classical prose.

When he was eighteen years old, he learned to read and write in Georgian and started working at the Georgian Orthodox church in his village. He then began to read a lot, and became familiar with several works of contemporary Georgian writers. In his works he often portrayed the tragic lives of the Ossetian poor, oppressed by chiefs and nobles. His works are richly influenced by the folklore and various legends of the cultures of the Caucasus. He is considered by some literary scholars to be the founder of classical Ossetian prose.

After his death on July 21 (August 3 in the Julian calendar), 1915, he was buried in the cemetery Meschansky Vladikavkaz, near Elias Chapel, which was later converted to a church. His grave was lost during the span of the Soviet Union.

His son, Tsomak Sekaevich, was also a famous writer.
