= Maharbek Tuganov =

Makharbek Safarovich Tuganov (Digor Ossetic: Туйгъанти Сафари фурт Махарбег, romanized: Tujghanti Safari furt Maxarbeg; Russian: Махарбек Сафарович Туганов, 1881–1952) was an Ossetian painter, illustrator and graphic designer, mostly known for his illustrations for the Nart saga. He was people's artist of North Ossetian ASSR and honored worker of arts of Georgian SSR. He was also a pupil of Ilya Repin.

== Biography ==
Maharbek Tuganow was born in 1881 in the village of Dur-Dur in Terek Oblast. His father, Safar Aslangerievich Tuganov, was a botanist. When he was 8 years old he applied to a private boarding school. In 1891 he applied to the Real School of Vladikavkaz. In 1900 he was sent to Saint Petersburg to apply to a mining institute, but instead he applied to the Imperial Academy of Arts, in which Ilya Repin was working. In 1907 he founded his own study of arts in Vladikavkaz. In 1920 he became a chief of the propaganda department of the local bolshevik party. In 1926-1930 he taught academic drawing in Pedagogical technical school of Vladikavkaz. In 1930 he went to South Ossetia, into the city of Stalinir (modern Tskhinvali), where he created an art gallery in the Museum of Local History and worked as a main painter of the South Ossetian Dramatic State theatre. He spent the last years of his life in Ordzhonikidze (modern Vladikavkaz). He died in 1952 and was buried in the necropolis of the Ossetian church.

== Memory ==
- North Ossetian Republican Museum of Arts was named after him (Vladikavkaz)
- Museum-house in his native village of Dur-Dur,
- Academy of Arts in Tskhinvali, South Ossetia, was named after him.
- Tuganov Street it Tskhinvali,
- Tuganov Street in Vladikavkaz,
- Tuganov street in Digora,
- Tuganov street in Dur-Dur,
- Tuganov Street in Beslan.
