= Zaza Eloshvili =

Georgian footballer

Personal information
- Full name: Zaza Eloshvili
- Date of birth: 16 October 1964
- Place of birth: Tbilisi, Georgian SSR, Soviet Union
- Date of death: 5 January 2001 (aged 36)
- Place of death: Georgia
- Height: 1.86 m (6 ft 1 in)
- Position: Defender

Youth career
- 1976–198?: FC Avaza Tbilisi

Senior career*
Years	Team	Apps	(Gls)
198?–1984	Avtomobilisti Tbilisi		
1984	Dinamo Tbilisi	0	(0)
1985	Locomotive Tbilisi	16	(2)
1986	Dinamo Tbilisi	0	(0)
1987	Kolkheti-1913 Poti	15	(1)
19??–1994	FC Antsi Tbilisi		
1994–1995	Duruji Kvareli	24	(2)

International career
1994	Georgia	1	(0)
- * Club domestic league appearances and goals

Zaza Eloshvili (Georgian: ზაზა ელოშვილი; Russian: Заза Элошвили sometimes referred to with the surname Eloev, ელოევი. (16 October 1964 – 5 January 2001) was a Georgian footballer who played as a defender and made one appearance for the Georgia national team.

== Career ==
Eloshvili played for the Dinamo Tbilisi reserve team, making nine appearances and scoring one goal in 1984, along with three appearances in 1986. He later made fifteen appearances and scored one goal for Kolkheti-1913 Poti in the Umaglesi Liga.

Eloshvili earned his first and only cap for Georgia on 23 February 1994 in a friendly against Israel. He came on as a half-time substitute for Georgi Nemsadze, with the away match in Ashdod finishing as a 0–2 loss for Georgia.

His career was halted due to injuries.

== Career statistics ==
=== International ===
Georgia
Year	Apps	Goals
1994	1	0
Total	1	0
