= Arsen Kotsoyev =

Ossetian writer (1872–1944)

Arsen Kotsoyev Коцойты Арсен
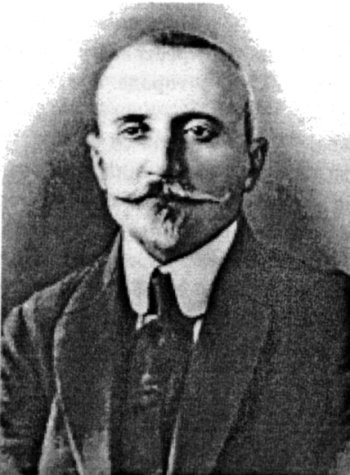
- Born: January 15, 1872; Gizel, Russian Empire
- Died: February 4, 1944 (aged 72); Vladikavkaz, Soviet Union (now Russia)
- Occupations: Prose writer, translator, opinion writer
- Writing career
- Pen name: A. K., Botash, Xabosh

Arsen Kotsoyev (Iron Ossetic: Коцойты Арсен, romanized: Kocojty Arsen; January 15, 1872 - February 4, 1944) was one of the founders of Ossetic prose, who had a large influence on the formation of the modern Ossetic language and its functional styles. He participated in all of the first Ossetic periodicals, and was one of the most notable Ossetian publicists.

There are streets named after Kotsoyev in Vladikavkaz and Beslan. His writings are mainstays of school courses on Ossetian literature.

== Life ==
Kotsoyev was born to a poor family in the Ossetian countryside (the village of Gizel, close to Vladikavkaz) in Terek Oblast. At the age of nine he was enrolled in the local school. There he found a large collection of books, which enriched his education. After school he studied at the Ardon Orthodox Seminary, but a sudden illness made him leave the seminary. He returned to Gizel and began writing short essays for newspapers of the North Caucasus. He also worked as a teacher at the local school.

In 1902 he took part in the uprising at Gizel, leading to his expulsion from the region. He chose to go to South Ossetia, where he continued to work as a teacher, and wrote short stories and essays.

In 1910 he began publishing a magazine called "Æфсир" (Æfsir, ear [of wheat]) based in Tiflis (today's Tbilisi, Georgia). Only 14 issues were published, but it had an immense impact on Ossetian literature and journalism. Many famous works of Ossetian literature were first published in it.

In 1912 Kotsoyev moved to Saint Petersburg, where he worked in many places, including Vladimir Lenin's famous newspaper Pravda. Despite his rural origins, he knew Russian well enough to proofread Russian newspapers.

After the October Revolution, Kotsoyev's fame grew. He worked for various newspapers and magazines, and in education and related fields. He died in Vladikavkaz and was buried in the yard of the Literature Museum.

== Work ==
Most of Kotsoyev's short stories are tragic, including stories about the severe traditions of the highlanders, such as "blood revenge" (vendetta), irad (bride money), and superstitions. He often wrote about traditional highland natives transplanted to a new, Europe-oriented world, and their fates.

Kotsoyev translated many works into Ossetic, including several stories by Pushkin.

He was awarded the Order of the Badge of Honor in 1939.
