= Vladimir Gagloyev =

Ossetian writer

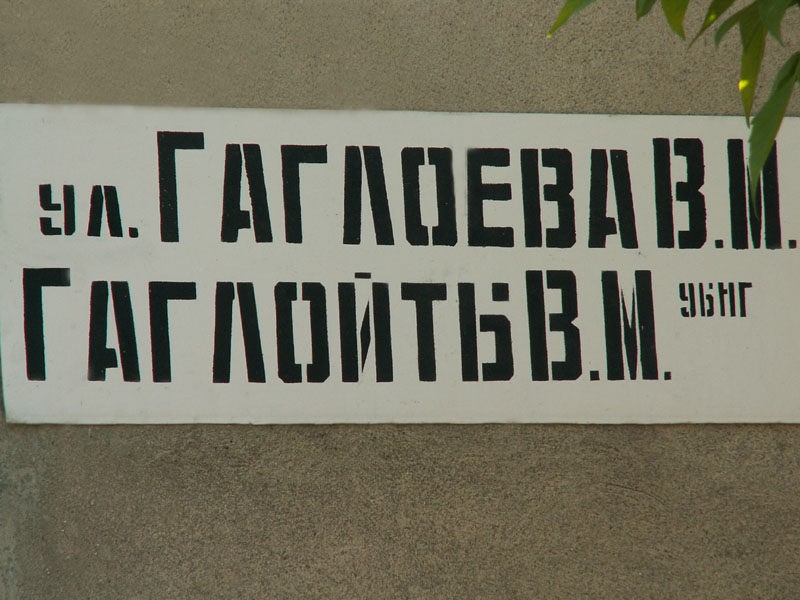
Vladimir Gagloev street in Tskhinvali, South Ossetia.

Vladimir Gagloyev (Ossetian: Гаглойты Владимир; 1 February 1927 in Dodot, Tskhinvali District, South Ossetia – 12 February 1996 in Moscow, Russia) was an Ossetian writer, playwright and publicist.

== Biography ==
He studied at the Maxim Gorky Literature Institute, after graduating from university he returned to South Ossetia.

From 1968 to 1976 he worked as editor-in-chief of the magazine Fidiuaeg (Ossetian: Фидиуæг, lit. 'Herald').

He was one of the people who contributed the most to the development of Ossetian theater. In particular, he translated into Ossetian A Profitable Position by Alexander Ostrovsky as well as plays by other authors like Aleksei Arbuzov and Nikolai Virta for production on the stage of the South Ossetian State Drama Theatre.

Gagloev is the author of the plays Unconquered People (1952), My Family (1955), Zalina (1957), which were staged at the South Ossetian State Drama Theatre. His novels Awakening and Ossetian Legend were published in relatively large print runs in Russian.
