= Ossetia =

Ethnolinguistic region in the Caucasus

Coordinates: 43°N 44°E

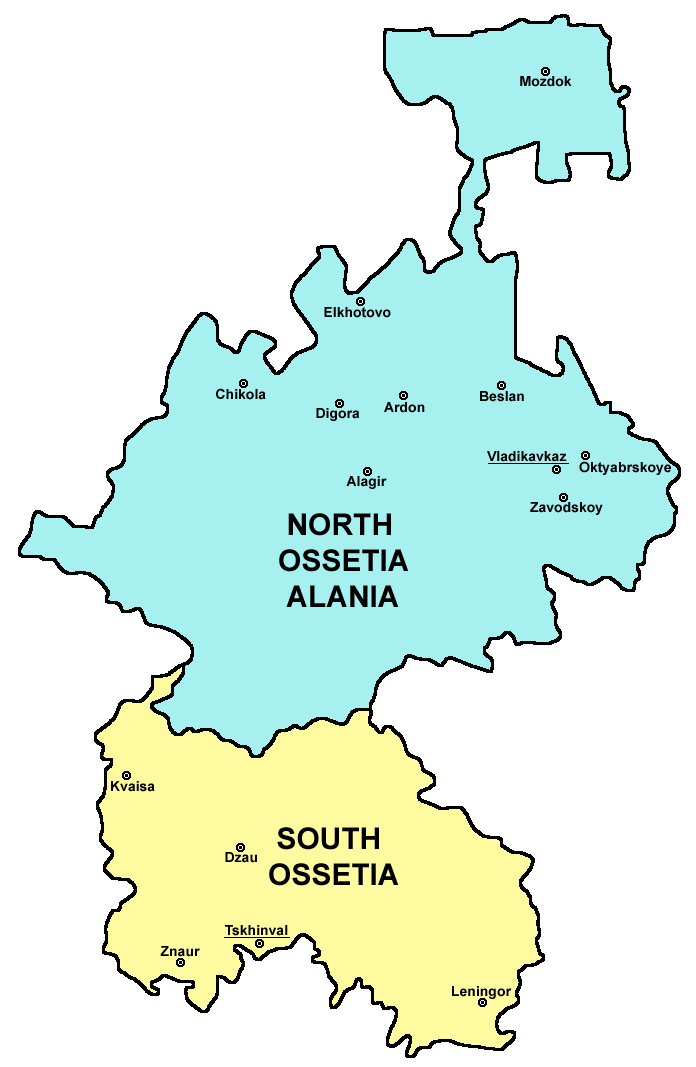
Map showing North and South Ossetia

Ossetia (/ɒˈsɛtiə/ o-SET-ee-ə, less common: /ɒˈsiːʃə/ o-SEE-shə; Iron Ossetian: Ирыстон, romanized: Iryston, pronounced [iˈrəston]; Digor Ossetian: Иристон, romanized: Iriston; or Ир romanized: Ir) is an ethnolinguistic region on both sides of the Greater Caucasus Mountains, largely inhabited by the Ossetians. The Ossetian language is part of the Eastern Iranian branch of the family of Indo-European languages. Most countries recognize the Ossetian-speaking area south of the main Caucasus ridge as lying within the borders of Georgia, but it has come under the control of the de facto government of the Russian-backed State of Alania. The northern portion of the region consists of the Republic of North Ossetia–Alania within the Russian Federation.

== Recent history ==
The ethnolinguistic map of the modern Caucasus showing the Ossetian-inhabited territories in

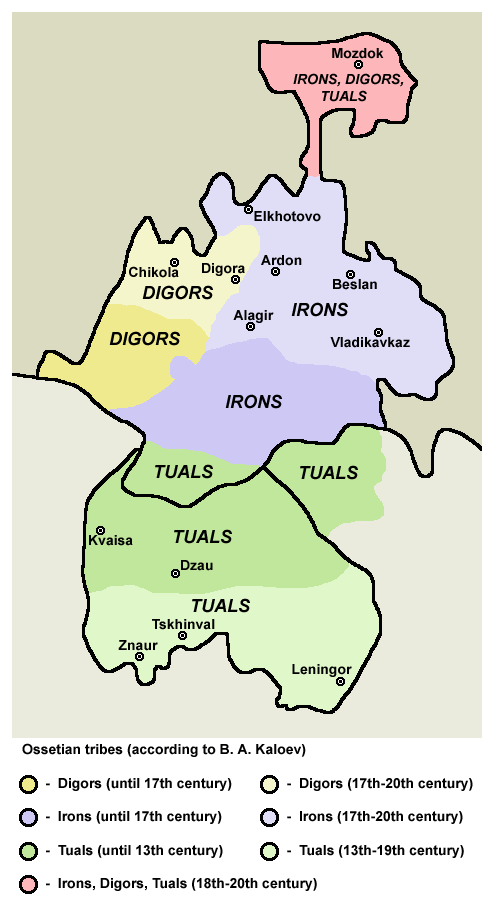
Ossetian tribes (according to Boris Kaloev)

- 1774-1830 – Expansion of the Russian Empire on Ossetian territory.
- 1922 – Creation of the South Ossetian autonomous oblast. North Ossetia remains a part of Russian SFSR, South Ossetia remains a part of Georgian SSR.
- 20 September 1990 – South Ossetia declares independence. The republic remained unrecognized, yet it detached itself from Georgia de facto. In the last years of the Soviet Union, ethnic tensions between Ossetians and Georgians in Georgia's former Autonomous Oblast of South Ossetia (abolished in 1990) and between Ossetians and the Ingush in North Ossetia evolved into violent clashes that left several hundred dead and wounded and created a large tide of refugees on both sides.

Although a Russian-mediated and Organization for Security and Co-operation in Europe-monitored ceasefire was implemented in South Ossetia in 1992, the Georgian-Ossetian conflict still remains unresolved even though a recent peace plan proposed by the government of Georgia promised the South Ossetians larger autonomy and pledged expanded international involvement in the political settlement of the conflict. Meanwhile, the South Ossetian secessionist authorities demand independence or unification with North Ossetia, which itself is located in Russia, while the international community instead recognizes it and Abkhazia as a part of Georgia.

On Sunday 12 November 2006, South Ossetians (mostly ethnic Ossetians) went to the polls to vote in a referendum regarding the region's independence from Georgia. The result was a "yes" to independence, with a turnout above 95% from those among the territory's 70,000 people who were eligible to vote at that time. There was also a vote in favor of a new term for Eduard Kokoity, who was the de facto state's president at the time.

There have been proposals from South Ossetia for joining the Russian Federation and uniting with North Ossetia.

Despite being part of the same ethnic group, the South and North Ossetians don't necessarily perceive each other as the same, for example, the South Ossetians refugees to North Ossetia during and after the 1991–1992 South Ossetia war were met with dislike by many among North Ossetians, who disparagingly called them "Gamsiks" (after then president of Georgia Zviad Gamsakhurdia). Some have characterized this as an expression of North Ossetian nationalism in relation to South Ossetians. The tensions emerged amidst the issues such as the distribution of housing and the rise of crime.

== See also ==
- History of North Ossetia–Alania
- Alania
- Vladimir Gagloyev
- Jászság
- Alexander Kubalov
- Samachablo
- Circassia
- Iazyges
- Adygea
