= Ray, Iran =

Neighborhood in Tehran province, Iran

Shahr-e Rey شهر ری
- Neighborhood
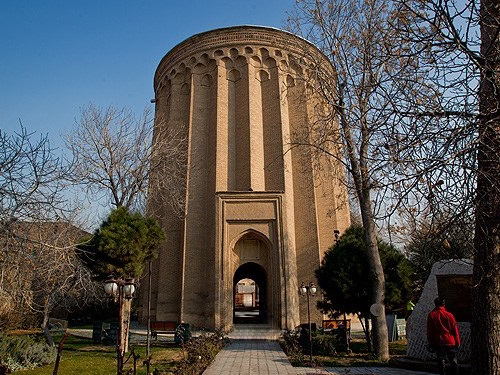
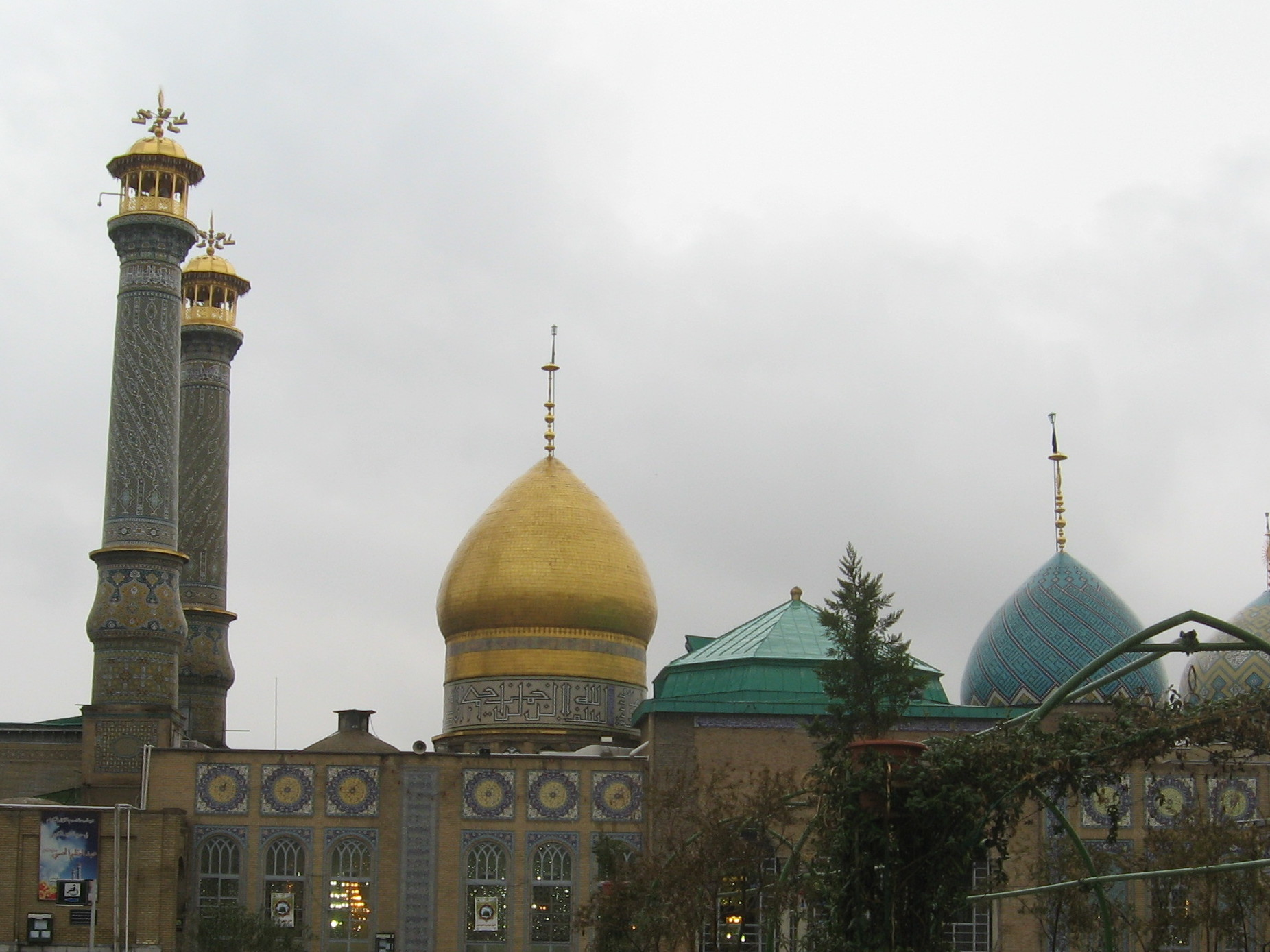
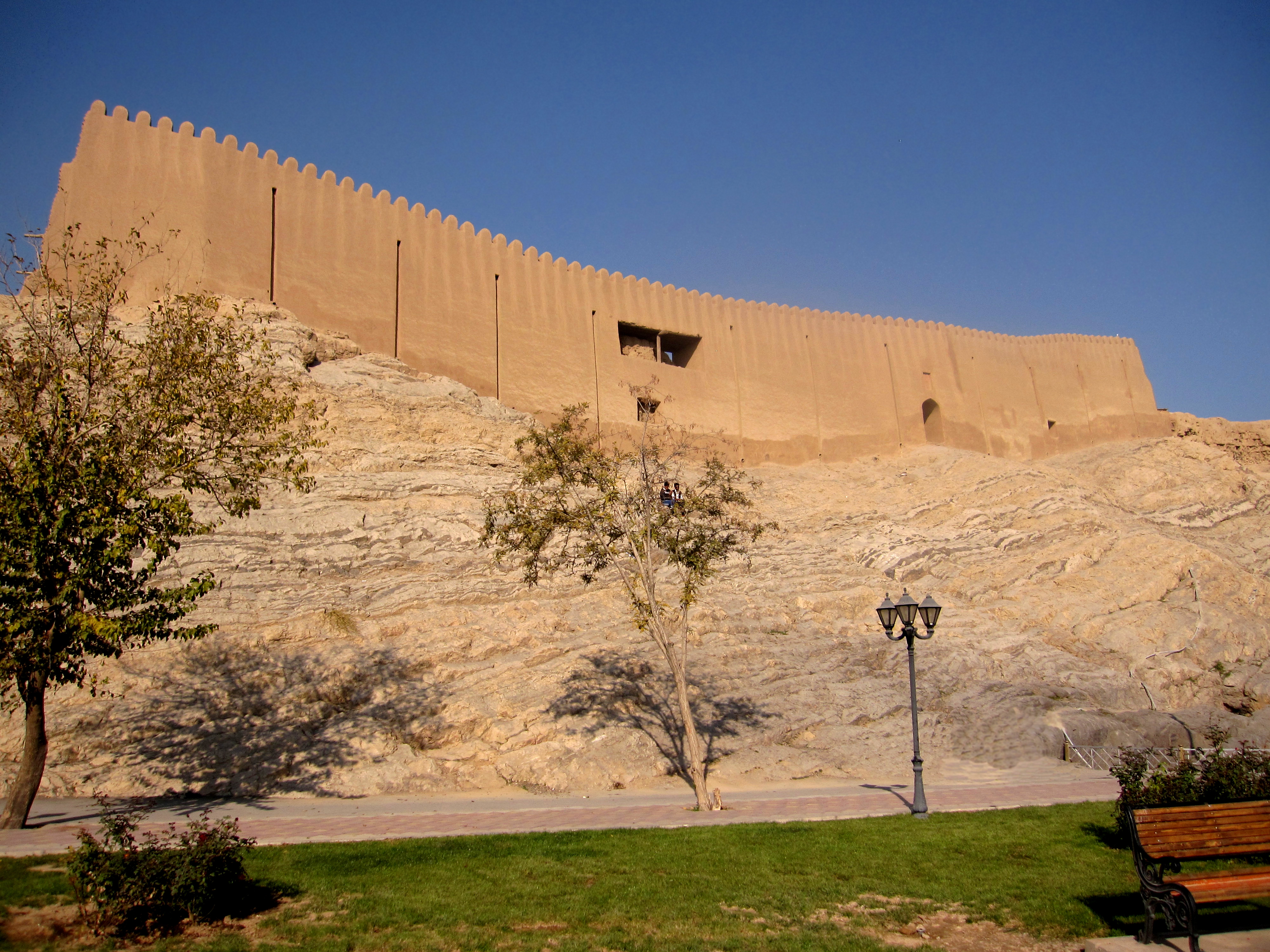
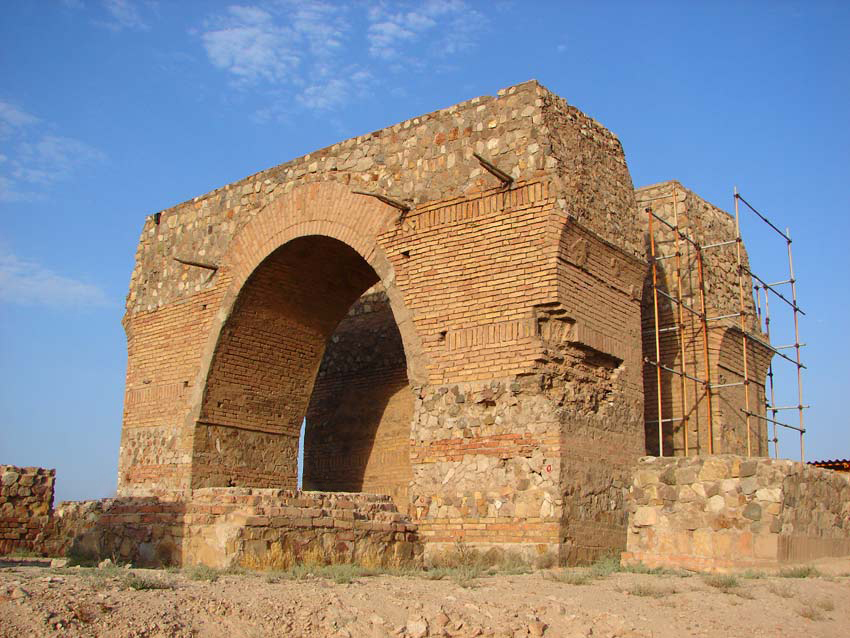
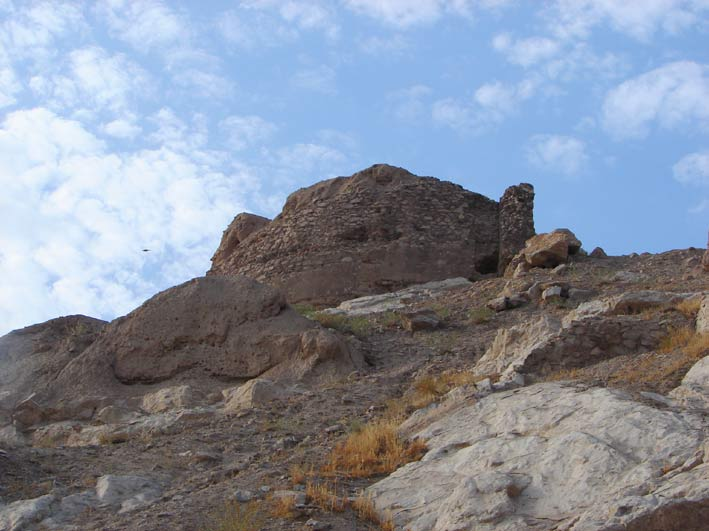
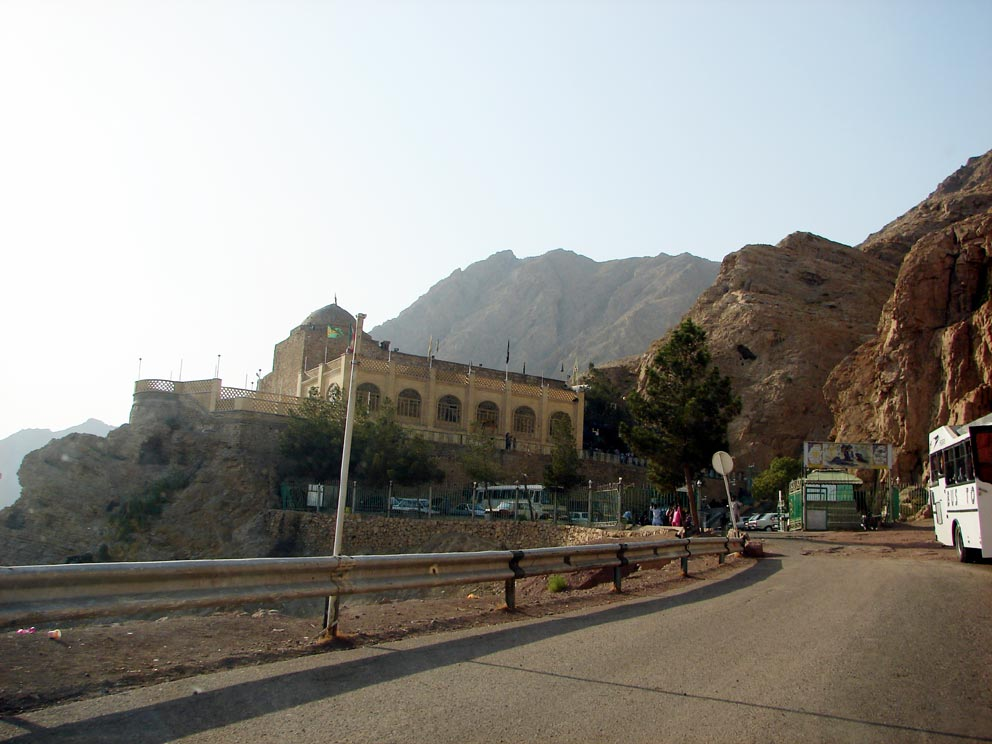
- From top; left to right: Tughrul Tower, Shah Abdol-Azim Shrine, Rey Castle, Bahram Fire Temple, Rashkan Castle and Bibi Shahrbanu Shrine.
- Nickname: Mother of Tehran
- Location within Iran Location within West and Central Asia
- Coordinates: 35°35′51″N 51°26′04″E
- Country: Iran
- Province: Tehran
- County: Tehran
- District: Central
- City: Tehran

Area
  - Total: 2,996 km^{2} (1,157 sq mi)
- Elevation: 1,180 m (3,870 ft)

Population (1996)
  - Total: 250,000
  - Density: 83/km^{2} (220/sq mi)
- Time zone: UTC+3:30 (IRST)
- Area code: 021

Shahr-e Ray (Persian: شهر ری) (Note: Also romanized as Ŝahr-e Rey; also known as Shahr Ray, Shahre Rey, and Shahr-e Rey (English: City of Rey), or simply Ray and Rey (ری)) is the capital of Ray County, Tehran province, Iran. Formerly a distinct city, it has now been absorbed into the metropolitan area of Greater Tehran as the 20th district of municipal Tehran, the capital city of the country.

In historical sources also known as Rhages (/ˈreɪdʒiːz/), Rhagae, and Arsacia, Ray is the oldest existing city in Tehran province. In the classical era, it was a prominent city belonging to Media, the political and cultural base of the Medes. Ancient Persian inscriptions and the Avesta (Zoroastrian scriptures), among other sources, attest to the importance of ancient Ray. Ray is mentioned several times in the Apocrypha. It is also shown on the fourth-century Peutinger Map.

The city was subject to severe destruction during the medieval invasions by the Arabs, Turks, and Mongols. Its position as a capital city was revived during the reigns of the Buyid Daylamites and the Seljuk Turks.

Ray is richer than many other ancient cities in the number of its historical monuments. The Neolithic site of Cheshme-Ali, the reconstructed Median-era Rey Castle, the Parthian-era Rashkan Castle, the Sasanian-era Zoroastrian Fire Temple of Bahram, and the possibly Zoroastrian and now Islamic Shrine of Bibi Shahrbanu are among the many archaeological sites in Ray.

Ray has been home to many historical figures, including royalty, merchants, scholars and poets. The medieval Persian scholar Rhazes, one of the most important figures in medical science, was from Ray. One of the etymologies proposed for the name of the Radhanites—a group of merchants, some of Jewish origin, who kept open the Eurasian trade routes in the early Middle Ages—links them to Ray.

Ray today has many industries and factories in operation. It is connected via the rapid transit system of Tehran Metro to the rest of Greater Tehran.

== Etymology ==
Shahr-e Ray (شَهرِ رِی, Šahr-e Rey) is Persian for "City of Ray". Ray or Rey (رِی) derives from Old Persian Ragā (𐎼𐎥𐎠), related to Persian رَخش rakhsh (red). It is recorded in Ancient Greek as Rhágai (Ῥάγαι) and Rháges (Ῥάγες) and in Latin as Rhagae and Rhaganae. It was once renamed Europos (Ευρωπός) under the Seleucid Empire.

The name is spelled in various forms, including Ray, Rey, Rayy and Rhay. Encyclopædia Iranica uses Ray.

In the past, the people of Ray were called "Razi".

== History ==
Agricultural settlements were long established as part of the Central Plateau Culture on local foothills such as that of Cheshme-Ali in northern Ray, which dates back to around 6,000 BC. The establishment of Ray has been attributed to ancient mythological monarchs, and it is also believed that Ray was the seat of a dynasty of Zoroastrian leadership.

=== Classical era ===
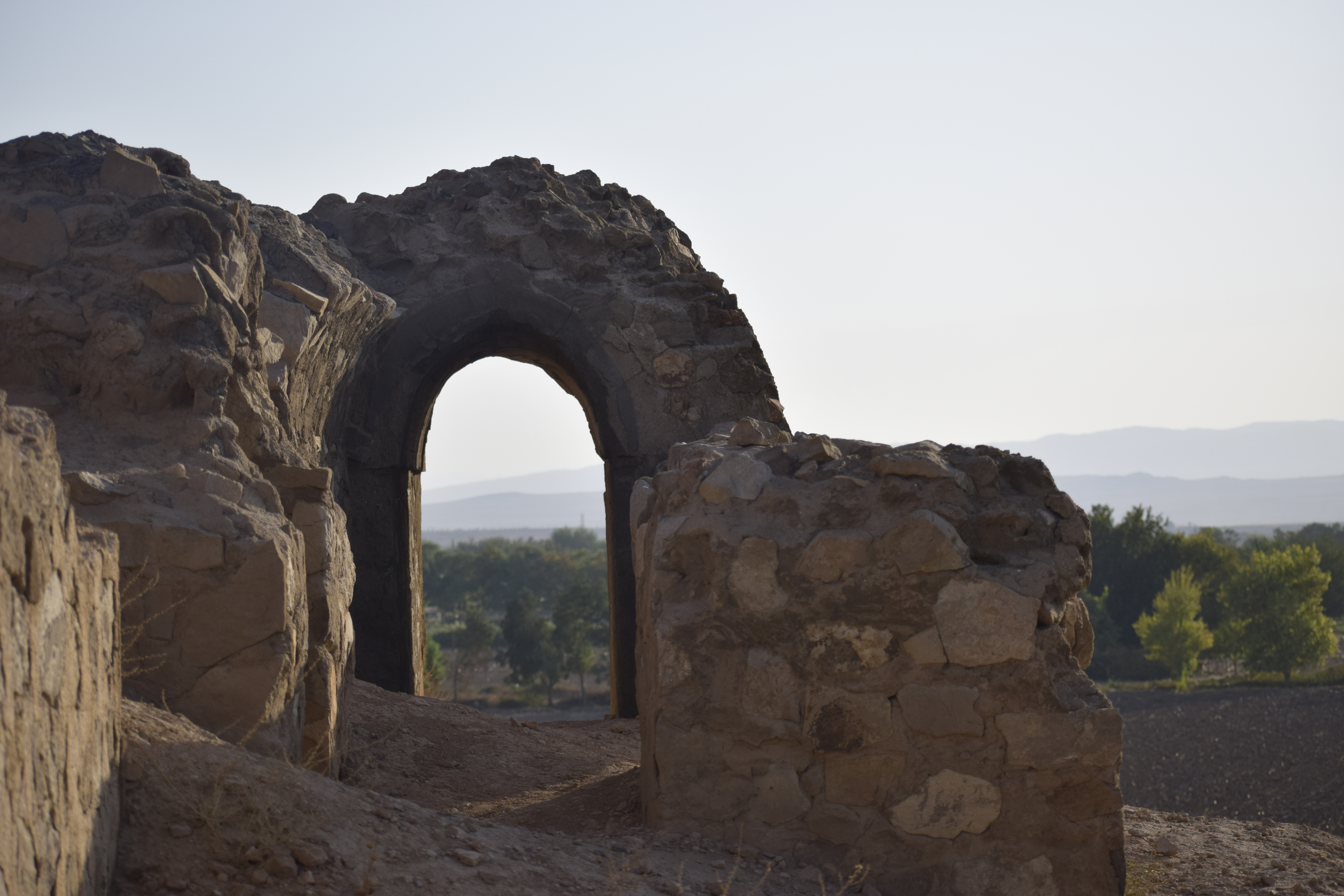
The Bahram Fire Temple (Teppe Mill) is a Zoroastrian fire temple from the time of the Sasanian Empire in Ray, Iran.

The Achaemenid Behistun Inscription mentions Ray (Old Persian: 𐎼𐎥𐎠, Ragā; Akkadian: 𒊏𒂵𒀪, ra-ga-; Elamite: 𒊩𒋡𒀭, rák-ka4-an) as a part of Media, which was the political and cultural base of the ancient Medes, one of the ancient Iranian peoples.

Ray was one of the main strongholds of the Seleucid Empire. During the Seleucid period, Alexander the Great's general Seleucus I Nicator renamed the city as Europos (Ευρωπός), honoring his home city in Macedonia. In c. 148 BC, Ray was conquered by the Parthian king Mithridates I (r. 165–132 BC). Following the Parthian conquest of Ray, the city was renamed Arsacia. The city remained an important site under the Parthians, as demonstrated by its many coin mints, under the name of ῬΑΓΑΙ/Ῥάγαι (the Greek form of Ragā/Raγā). Ray was used as one of the shifting capitals of the Parthian Empire, according to Athenaeus. According to Isidore of Charax, under the Parthian and Seleucid eras, Ray was surrounded by the province of Rhagiana together with four other cities. Ray was amongst the bases used by the Parthians to thwart nomadic attacks and to occasionally invade the Central Asian steppe.

Under the Sasanian Empire, Ray (Middle Persian: 𐭫𐭣𐭩) was located near the center of the empire. It was the base of the powerful House of Mehran and the House of Spandiyad, two of the Seven Great Houses of Iran during the Sasanian period.

=== Middle Ages ===
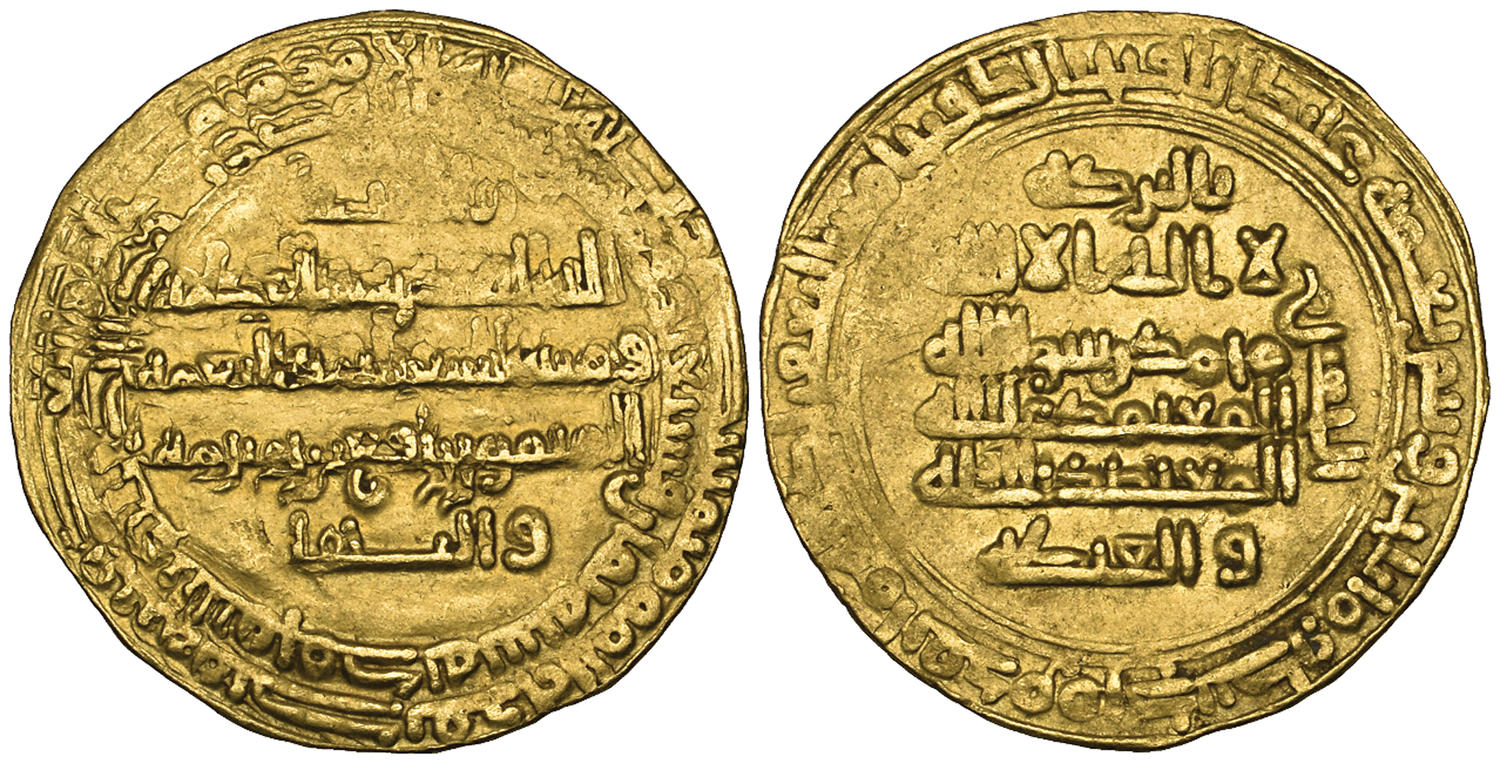
Abbasid gold dinar minted in Ray during the governorship of Rafi ibn Harthama, ruler of Khorasan, 9th-century AD

Siyavash, the son of Mehran and the last King of Ray in the Sasanian Empire, was defeated fighting the Muslim invasion in 643. Ray was then used as a camp site under Arab Muslim military occupation. By the time of the Abbasid Caliphate, Ray was considerably restored and expanded into a new city named Mohammadiya. During the early Islamic period, the language spoken in Ray was the Razi dialect, which was most likely a continuation of the Median language.

The Shah Abdol-Azim Shrine, a shrine containing the tomb of Abd al-Aziz al-Hasani, a fifth generation descendant of Hasan ibn Ali and a companion of Muhammad al-Taqi, was built in the ninth century. It remains as the main Islamic sanctuary of the city to date.

A Tower of Silence, where Zoroastrians of Ray after the Muslim conquest had come to put the bodies of the dead in the open, was built by a wealthy inhabitant of Ray on a hill in the tenth century. The tower, today in ruins and designated as Gabri (a term denoting "Zoroastrian", adopted after the Muslim conquest), was reportedly soon taken by the Muslims.

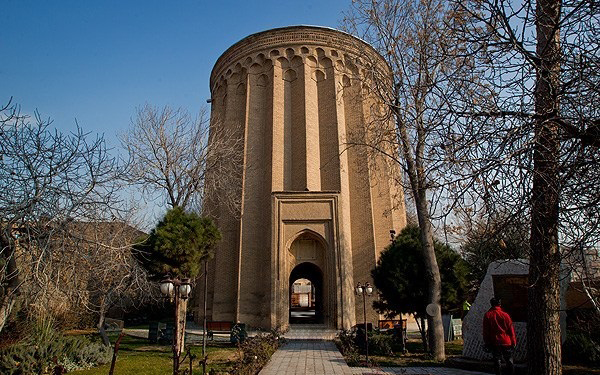
The 12th-century Seljuk-era Tughrul Tower in Ray, Iran.

Also dating to the tenth century is the Bibi Shahrbanu Shrine, which is the site of a former Zoroastrian temple dedicated to Anahita, the ancient Iranian goddess of the waters. The temple has been converted into a Muslim shrine claimed to be the burial of Shahrbanu, a legendary Sasanian princess who was captured by the Muslims and married Husayn ibn Ali, the grandson of Muhammad. It is likely that the name shahrbanu, meaning "lady of the land", is in fact an attribution to Anahita, who bore the title banu ("lady").

In 945, Rukn al-Dawla of the Buyid dynasty conquered Ray and was one of the capital cities of the Buyid empire. It was struck by earthquakes in 957-958 which caused severe damage to both buildings and populace. Ray was one of the cities that were equipped with rapid postal service, which was predominantly used for transferring official mails. The Buyid period came to an end in 1029, when the city was sacked brutally by Mahmud of Ghazni. A zealous Sunni, Mahmud had large numbers of the local population, consisting of Ismailis and Mazdakites, crucified and many books of the great library of Rayy burned as he considered them heretical.

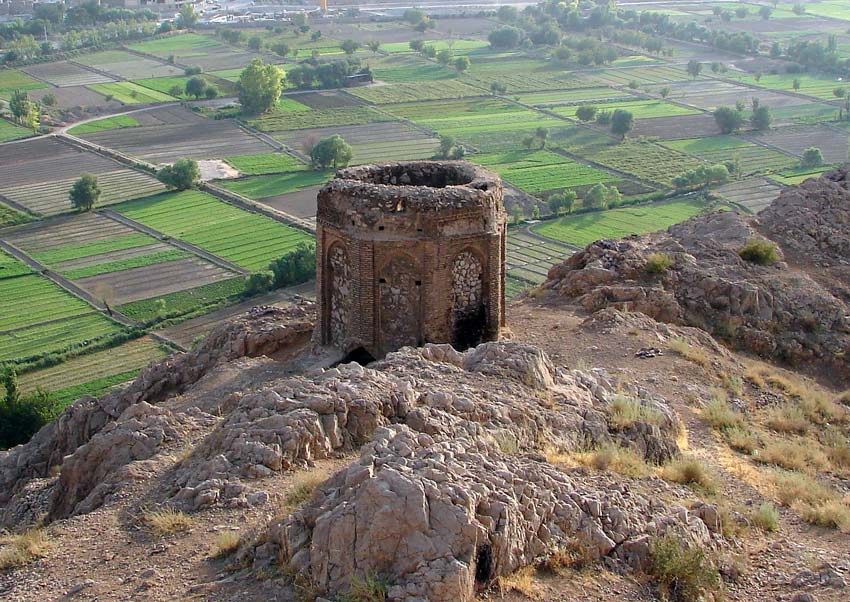
Naghare-khane, a structure identified as a tomb from before the Mongol invasion, located outside the old city walls of Ray.

Ray became later a capital city of the Seljuk Empire in the 11th century. During this time, the city of Ray was at its greatest expanse. It had developed a great urban market that also benefited its neighboring regions, including the once small town of Tehran, and had become a remarkable center for silk weaving. Commercial goods imported by traders via the Silk Road were brought into the bazaar of Ray. One of the monuments that survives from this period is the 12th-century Tughrul Tower, a brick tower built in 1140 that is attributed to Tughrul I, the founder of the Seljuk Empire.

Ray was home to a Shia Muslim community and some of the earliest Shia madrasas in Iran already in the 12th century, at least one established by Shia scholar Qazvini Razi, prior to the later Safavid official adoption of Shiism as the state religion.

In the early 13th century, following the Mongol invasion of Iran, Ray was severely destructed. It was abandoned and eventually lost its importance in the presence of the nearby growing town of Tehran. Ray remained abandoned throughout the time of the Timurid Empire.

=== Early modern times ===
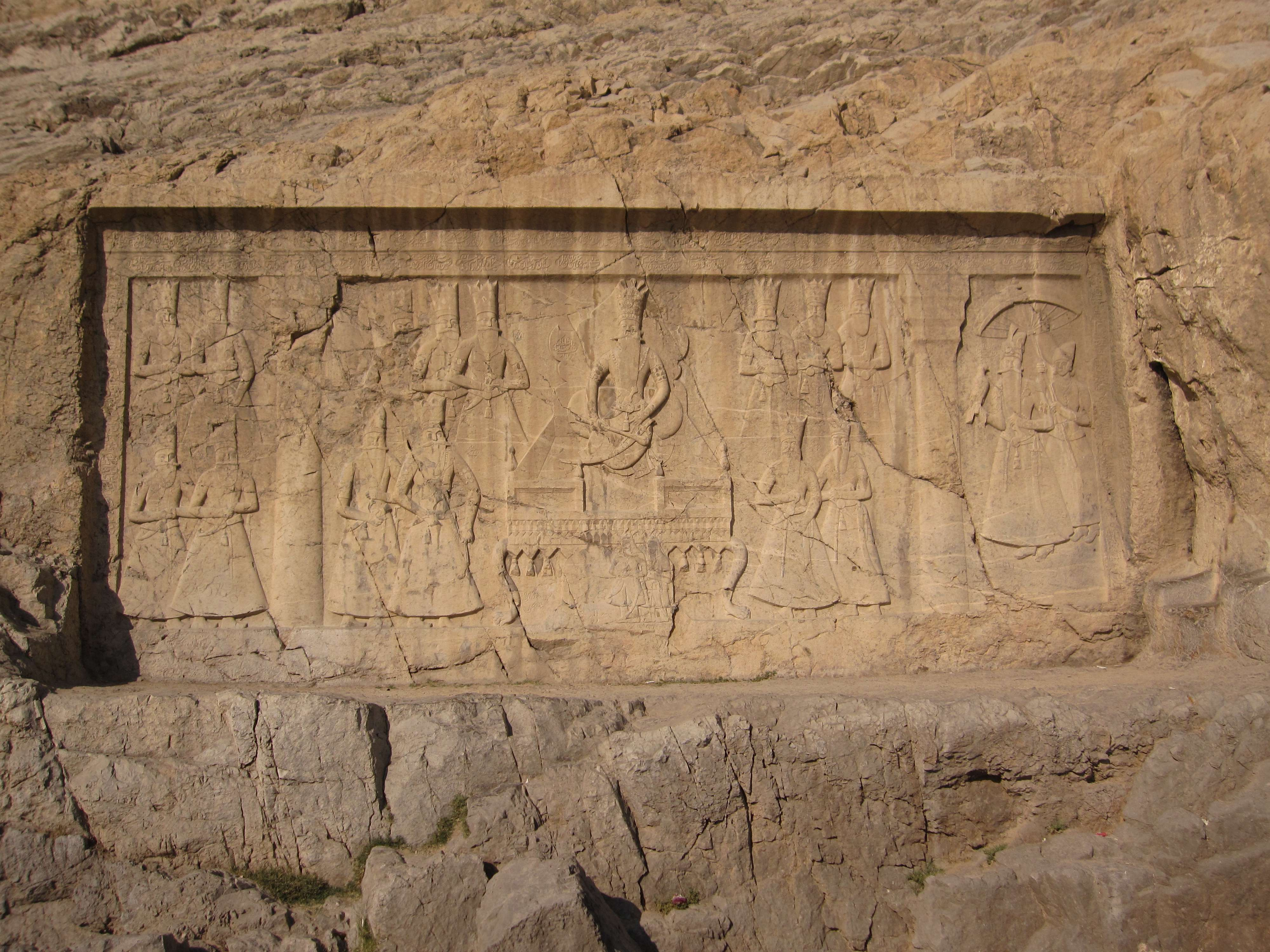
The Qajar-era Fath Ali Shah Inscription at Cheshme-Ali, Ray.

Amin Razi, a Persian geographer from Ray who lived by the time of the Safavid dynasty, attests to the "incomparable abundance" of the gardens and canals of his hometown. In 1618, Italian author Pietro Della Valle described Ray as a large city with large gardens that was administered by a provincial governor but was not urbanized and did not seem to be inhabited.

The shrines of Shah Abdol-Azim and Bibi Shahrbanu, among other religious shrines throughout Iran, were notably reconstructed during the early modern period, using architectural techniques that were developed since the time of the Safavid dynasty to the time of the Qajar dynasty.

There is a relief located at Cheshme-Ali from the time of Fath-Ali Shah of the Qajar dynasty, who often used to explore the city, which shows the Qajar ruler in a hunting scene, replacing a former Sasanian relief that depicted an ancient Persian emperor in the same manner. It was engraved in 1831, and its surrounding was decorated with tablets covered with poetry.

=== Contemporary era ===
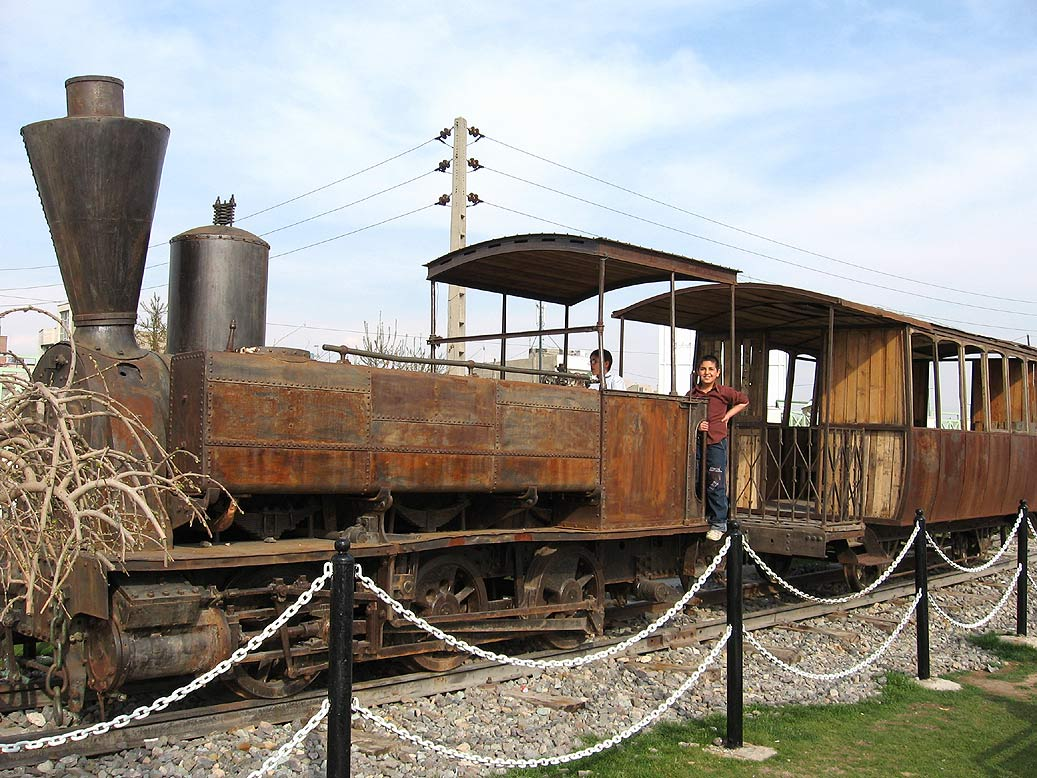
An old locomotive that connected Tehran and Ray on one of Iran's earliest railways.

In the middle of the 19th century, Ray was described as a place of ruins, the only settlement being around the Shah Abdol-Azim Shrine. Being the only important pilgrimage site in vicinity to the royal court in the new capital Tehran brought more people to visit the shrine and a major restoration was sponsored by the court. Thus, between the years 1886 and 1888, under the reign of Qajar ruler Naser al-Din Shah, Ray became the first place in Iran to be connected to the capital by a railway. The railway had a short single line and transported a few steam locomotives that were colloquially called māšin dudi ("smoky machine"), between terminals that were called gār (from French gare).

Excavations in the old city began in the late 19th century, and many of the findings were traded. Between 1933 and 1936, the Cheshme-Ali hill was excavated by archaeologists from the Boston Fine Arts Museum and the University Museum at the University of Pennsylvania headed by Erich Schmidt, which resulted in the discovery of a number of 7,000-year-old artifacts. Some of the discovered objects are displayed at museums in Iran, Chicago, and Philadelphia. Due to real estate expansions in the 1980s and 1990s, the hill is now mostly leveled out. Further excavations began in 1997, in a collaboration between the Iranian Ministry of Cultural Heritage, the Department of Archaeological Sciences of the University of Bradford and the Department of Archaeology of the University of Tehran.

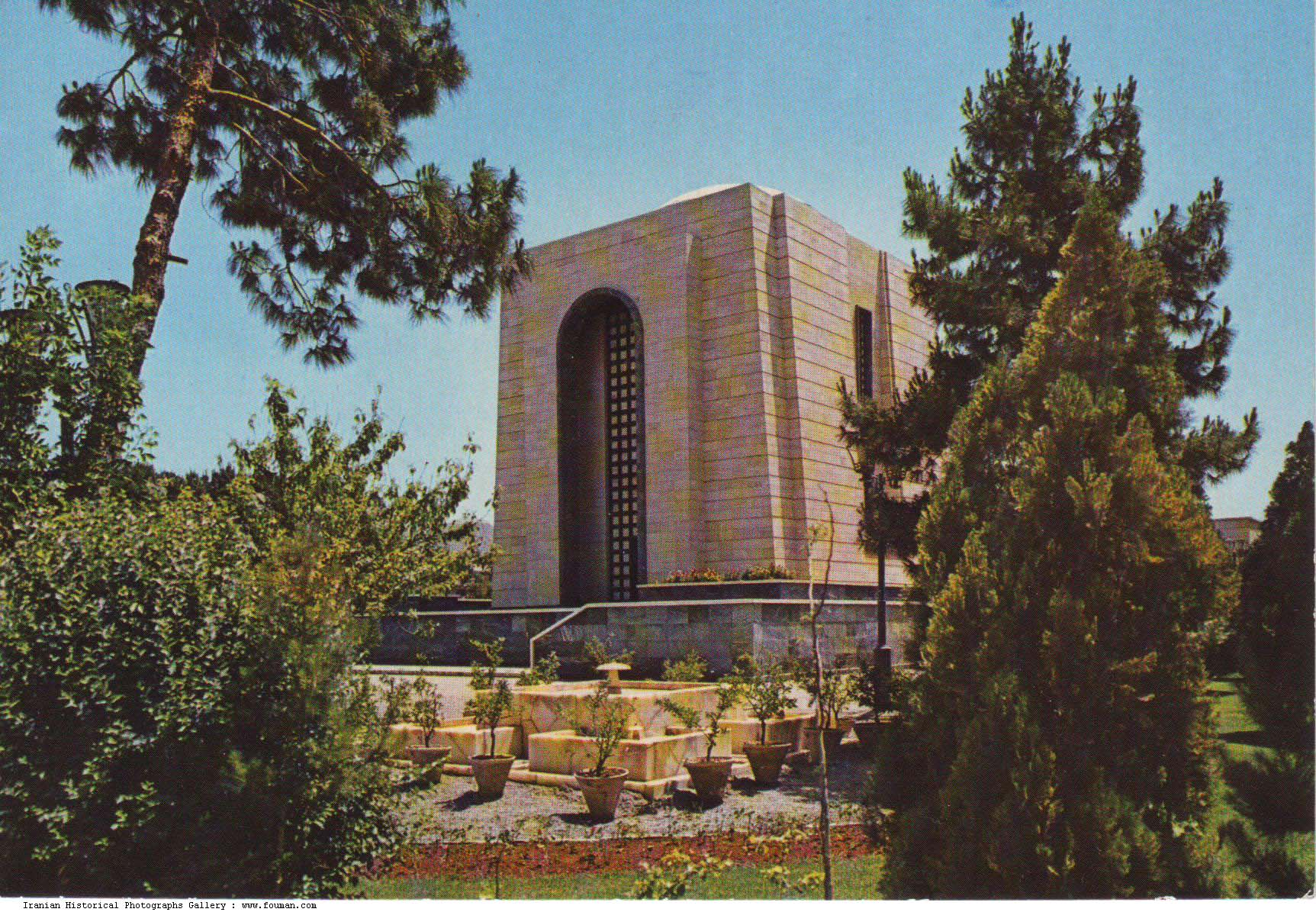
The Mausoleum of Reza Shah in the 1950s prior to its destruction.

In 1951, Reza Shah of the Pahlavi dynasty, the second last shah of the Imperial State of Iran, was buried by the order of his son and successor Mohammad Reza Pahlavi in a mausoleum dedicated to him in Ray. The mausoleum was built near the Shah Abdol-Azim Shrine. Following the 1979 Revolution, the Mausoleum of Reza Shah was destroyed under the direction of Sadegh Khalkhali, an infamous cleric who was appointed by Ruhollah Khomeini as the head of the newly established Revolutionary Courts.

== Geography ==
=== Mountain ranges ===
Ray County is located in the plain and its mountains are not very tall. These mountains are:

- Bibi Sharbanu (کوه بی بی شهر بانو): The Bibi Sharbanu mountains are located in the east of Ray City, measuring 1535 meters above sea level.
- Arad mountains (کوه آراد): located in the center of Ray County, on the border between Kahrizak and Fashapoye parts, its height is 1428 meters. This range also appears in a map dated to 1307 AH, during the era of Naser al-Din Shah Qajar, drawn by two Iranian engineers of the time. In the book Detailed Geography of Iran, Mount Arad is mentioned with the name of mountains Hasanabad and Kanargard (حسن‌آباد and کنارگرد).
- Mar_e (mære): located in the southwest of Ray City and in the south of the cities of Hassanabad and Rudshur. Its height is 1503 meters.
- Kūh-e Qarah Bologh (کوه کورابلاغ): This mountain is located at the intersection of four cities, Zarandiyeh, Saveh, Ray and Qom.

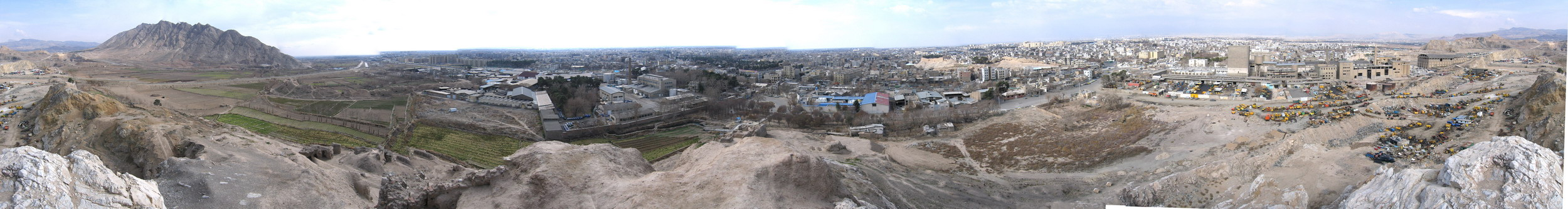

=== Rivers ===
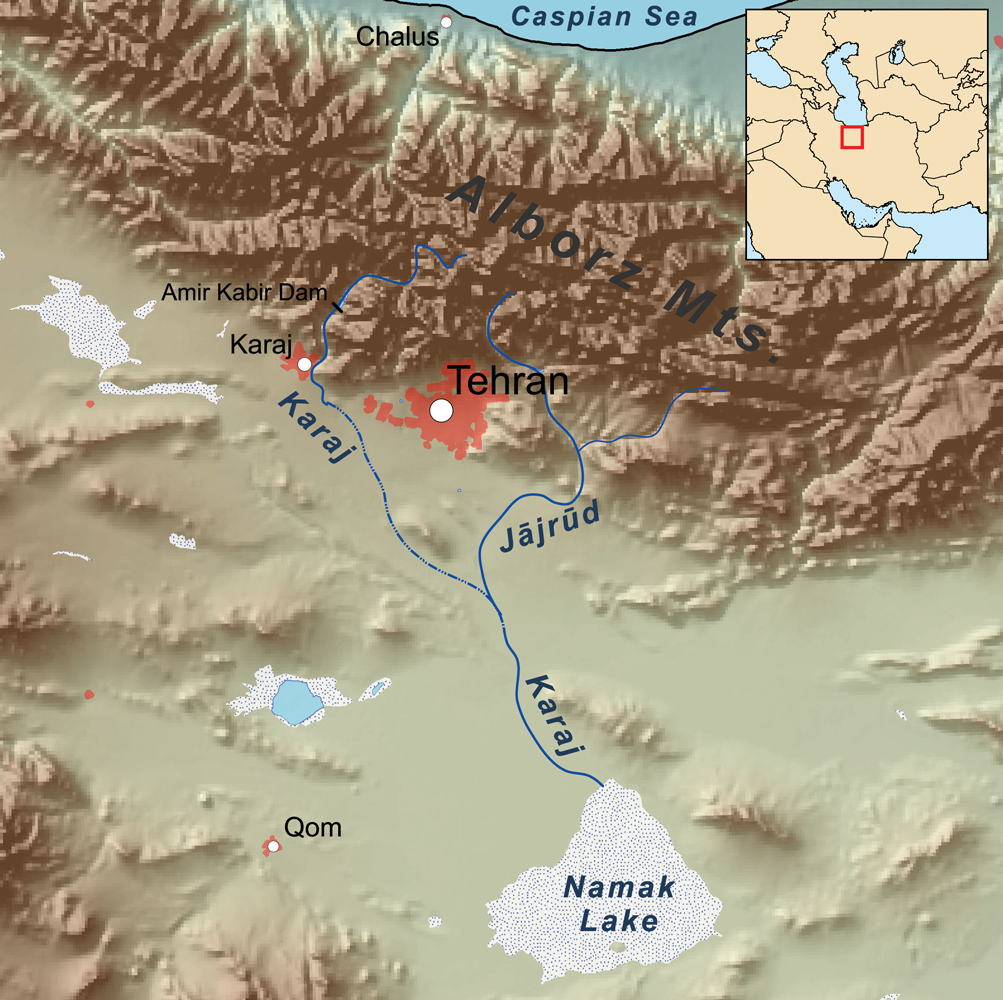

- Karaj River: The Karaj River originates from Mount Alborz and flows into the Salt Lake after passing through several cities in Tehran Province. This river runs in a northwest-southeast direction throughout Ray City and after joining one of the branches of Jajroud flows into the salt lake. It is the second largest river after Zayandarud in the central plateau region.
- Jajrud river: Jajroud river is one of the permanent and important rivers of Tehran province, which flows along the southern direction and finally into the salt lake. A branch of this river passes through the eastern border of Ray City.
- Shur Fashapoye River: The Shore River originates from Zanjan province and after passing through Qazvin province, the southwest of Tehran province and Zarandieh city, it reaches Ray City. This river crosses the width of Ray city in a northwest-southeast direction. The river is permanent and is 420 kilometers long.

=== Vegetation ===
The climate of the city is semi-arid and therefore does not have a natural forest, But it has a hand-planted forest of 387 hectares. However, in terms of pasture, it is relatively rich and has 166,200 hectares of pasture.

=== Climate ===
Rey has a cold semi-arid climate (Köppen BSk).

Climate data for Shahre-Rey
Month	Jan	Feb	Mar	Apr	May	Jun	Jul	Aug	Sep	Oct	Nov	Dec	Year
Mean daily maximum °C (°F)	9 (48)	12 (54)	17 (63)	24 (75)	29 (84)	36 (97)	38 (100)	37 (99)	33 (91)	26 (79)	17 (63)	11 (52)	24 (75)
Mean daily minimum °C (°F)	1 (34)	3 (37)	8 (46)	13 (55)	18 (64)	23 (73)	26 (79)	25 (77)	21 (70)	15 (59)	8 (46)	4 (39)	14 (57)
Average precipitation mm (inches)	29.8 (1.17)	30.5 (1.20)	37.3 (1.47)	32.0 (1.26)	9.2 (0.36)	5.4 (0.21)	7.1 (0.28)	5.0 (0.20)	1.0 (0.04)	9.9 (0.39)	26.4 (1.04)	24.7 (0.97)	218.3 (8.59)
Source: NOAA

== Notable people ==
- Muhammad ibn Zakariya al-Razi, Persian physician, philosopher and alchemist
- Abu Hatim al-Razi, Major Sunni Hadith scholar
- Abu Zur’ah Ar-Razi, Major Sunni Hadith Scholar
- Amin Razi
- Harun al-Rashid, Abbasid caliph
- Fakhr al-Din al-Razi, Ash'ari, Theologian and Qur'an Exegete
- Qutb al-Din al-Razi, Theologian and logician
- Najmeddin Razi
- Morteza Avini
- Mohammad Reza Heydari
- Javad Nekounam
- Farzad Ashoubi
- Hadi Saei
- Alireza Dabir
- Hamid Sourian
- Mehdi Kamrani
- Ruhollah Zam
- Hasan Irlu

== Gallery ==
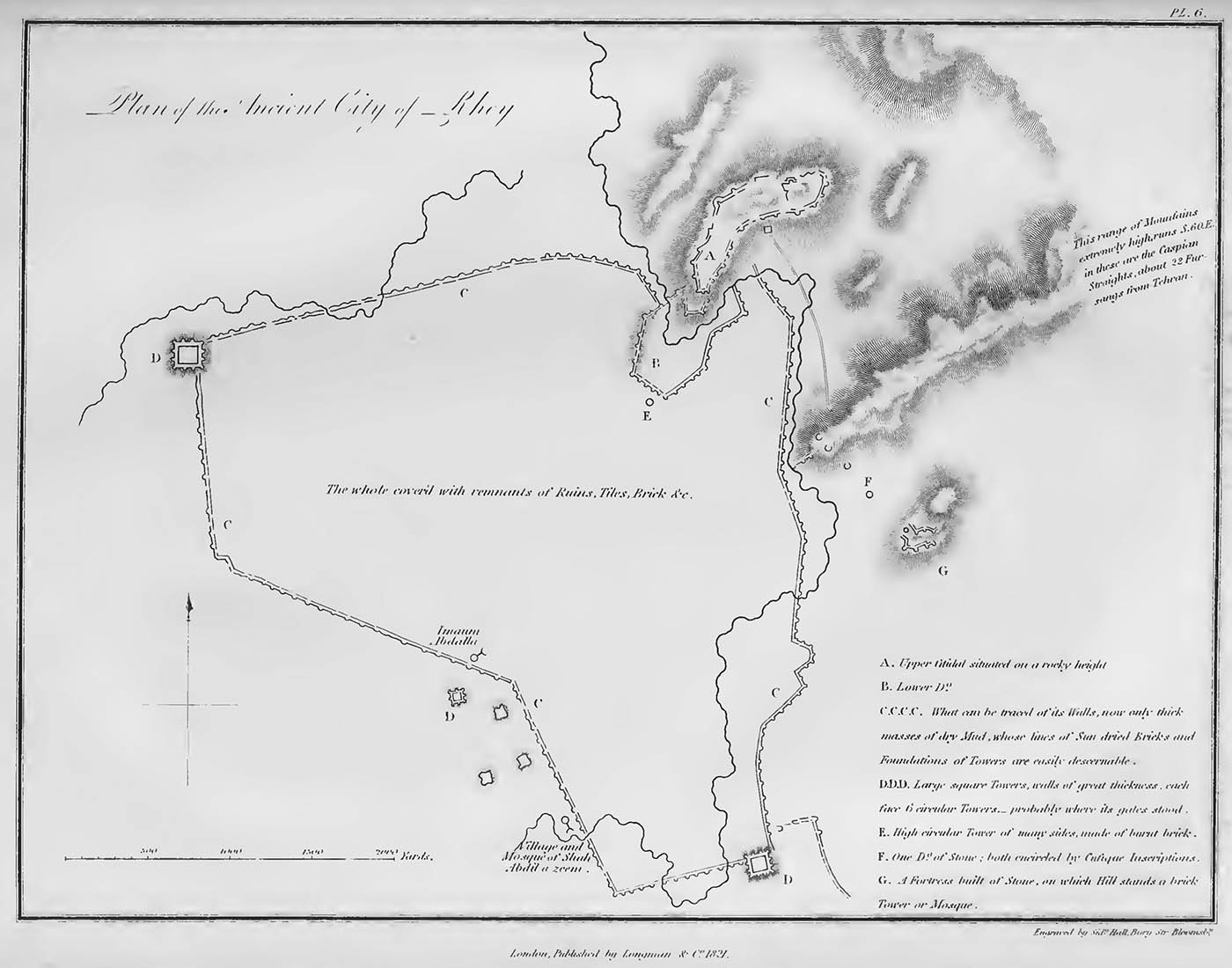
A 1818 map of Ray by Scottish traveler Robert Ker Porter.

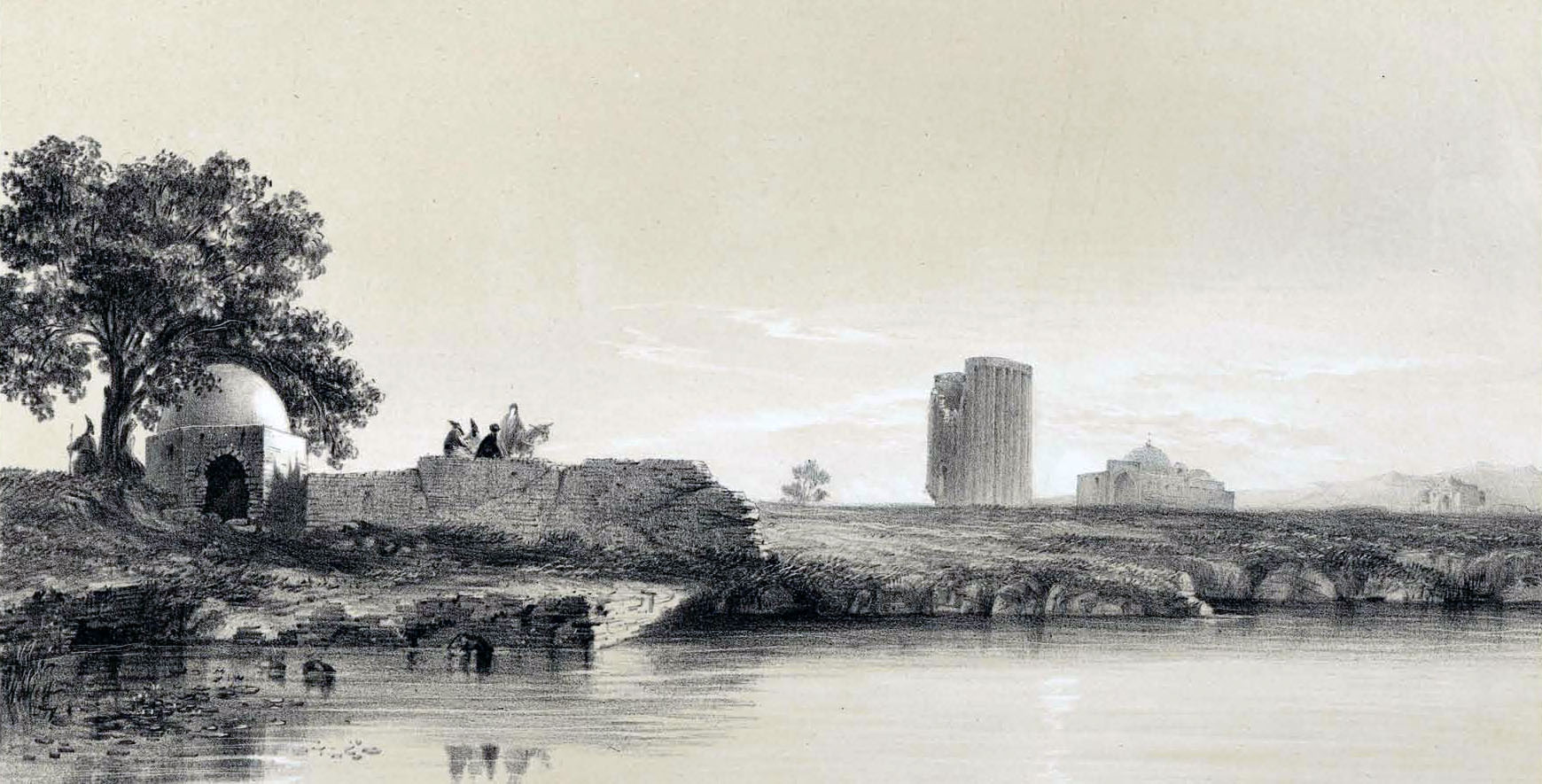
A 1840 depiction of the 12th-century Seljuk-era Tughrul Tower of Ray by French orientalist Eugène Flandin.

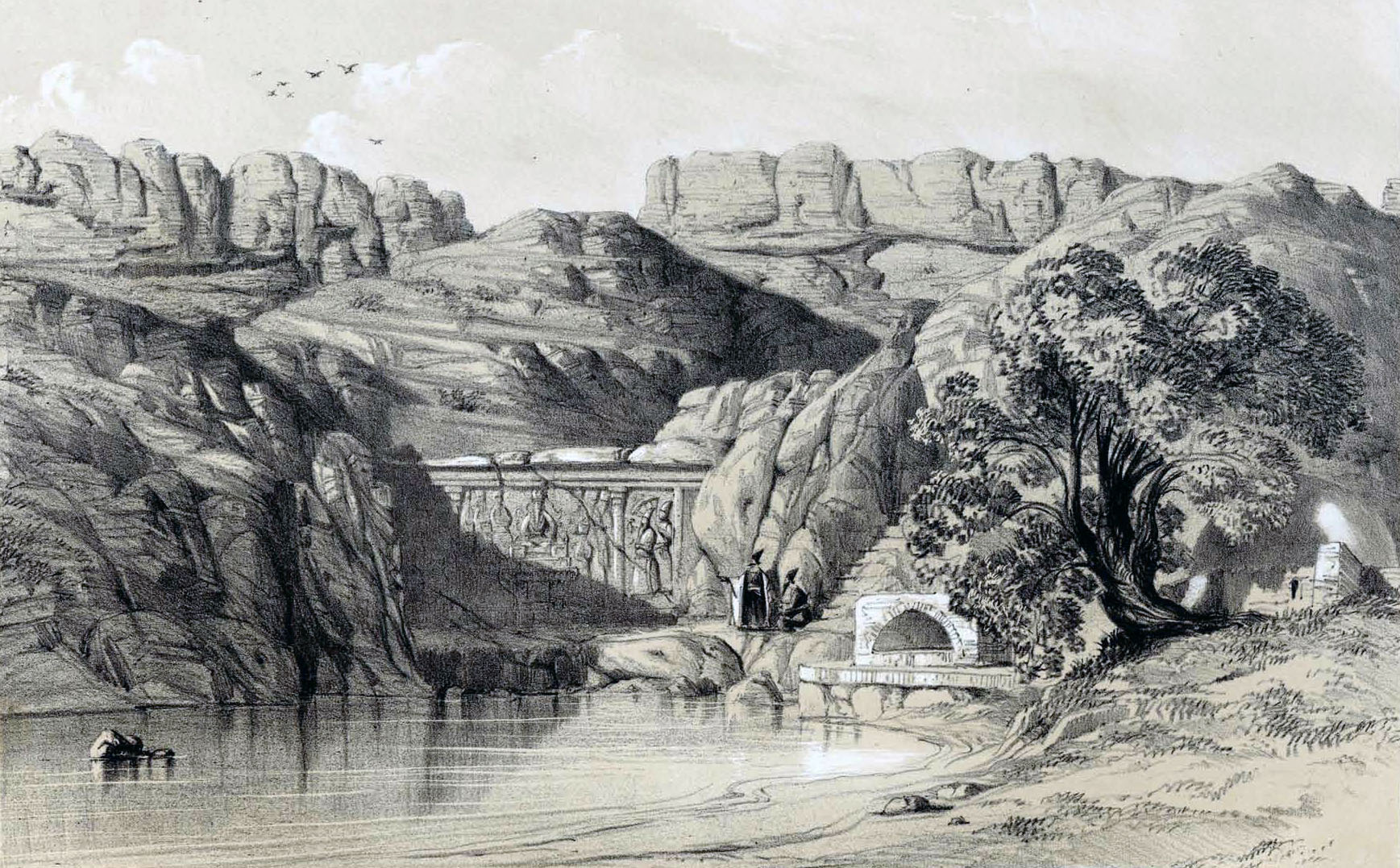
A 1840 depiction of Cheshme-Ali in Ray by French orientalist Eugène Flandin.

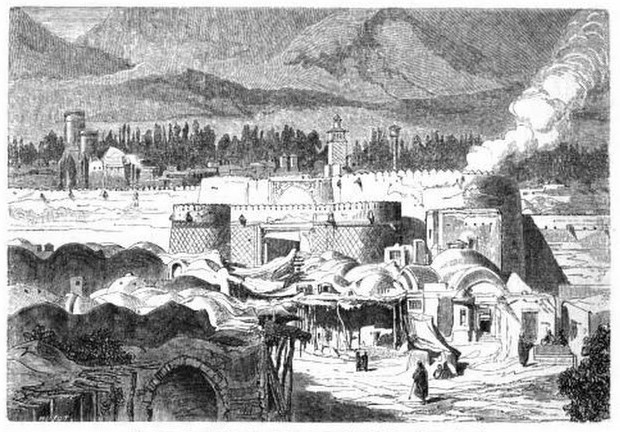
A 1860 depiction of Ray by French orientalist Jules Laurens.

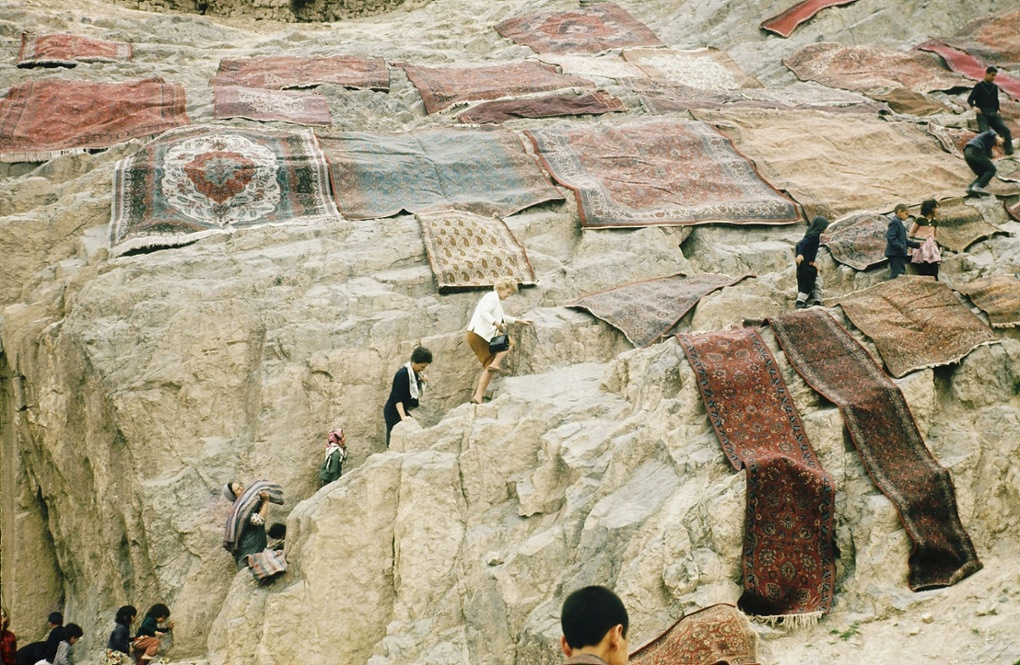
People spreading washed carpets to dry at Cheshme-Ali in 1960.

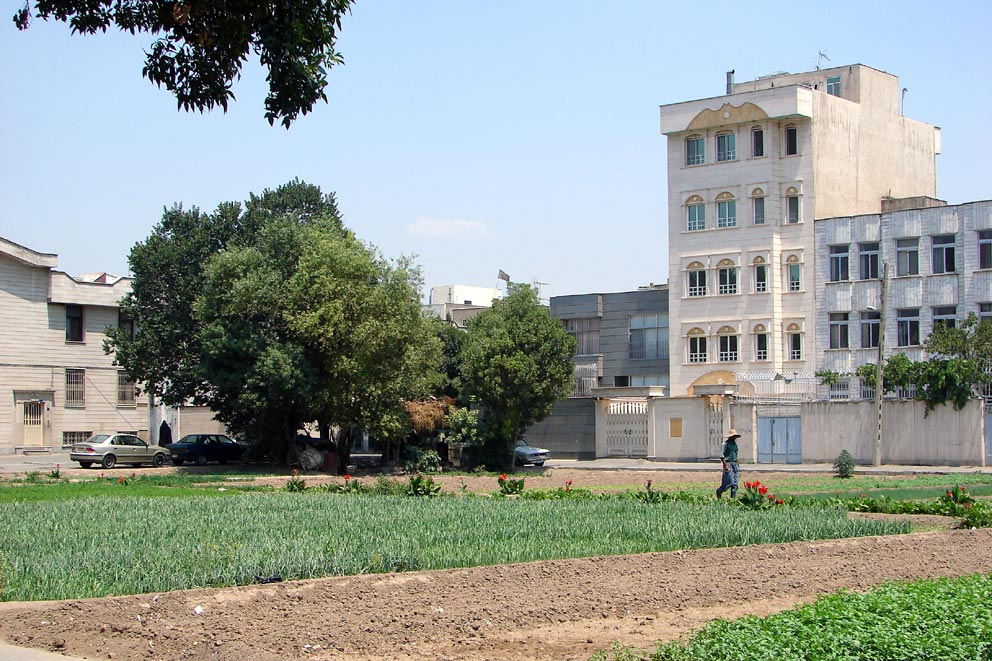
Growing vegetables in a residential area in Ray.

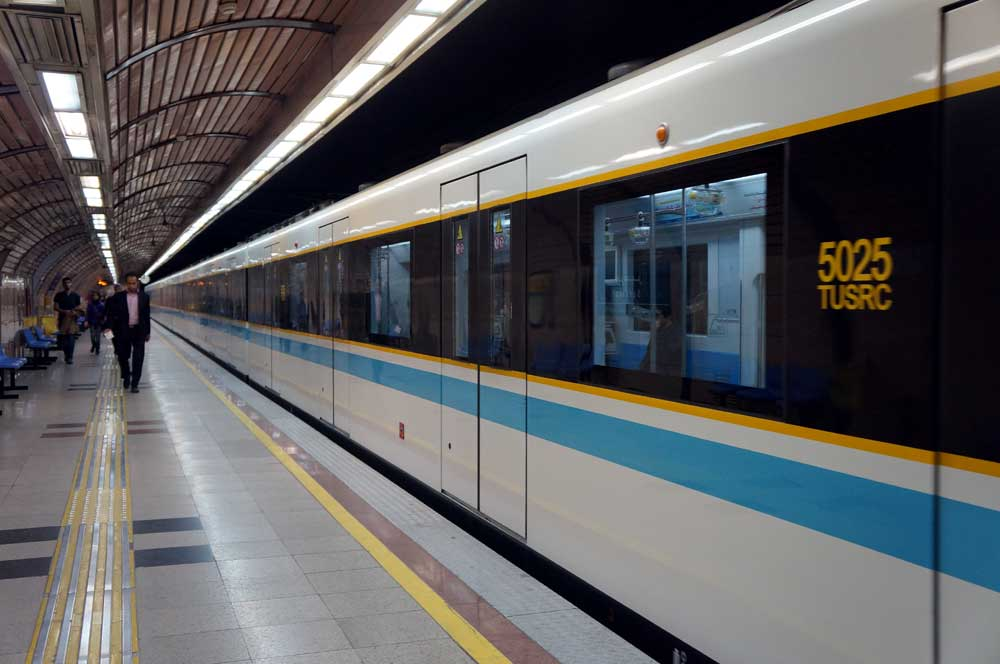
Shahr-e-Rey Metro Station, part of the rapid transit system of Tehran Metro.

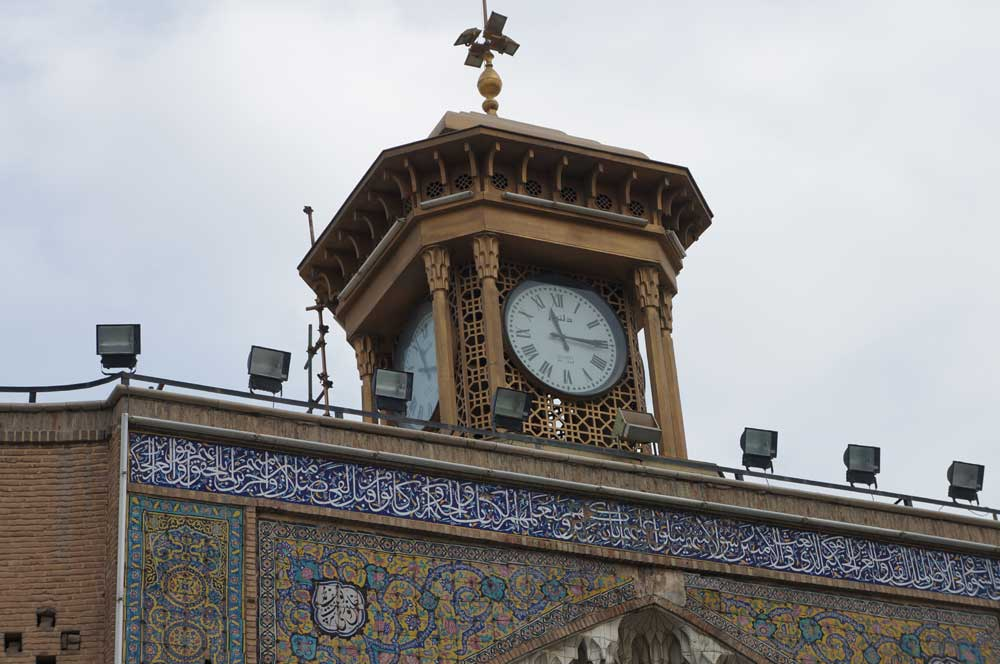
The clock tower of the Shah Abdol-Azim Shrine in Ray.

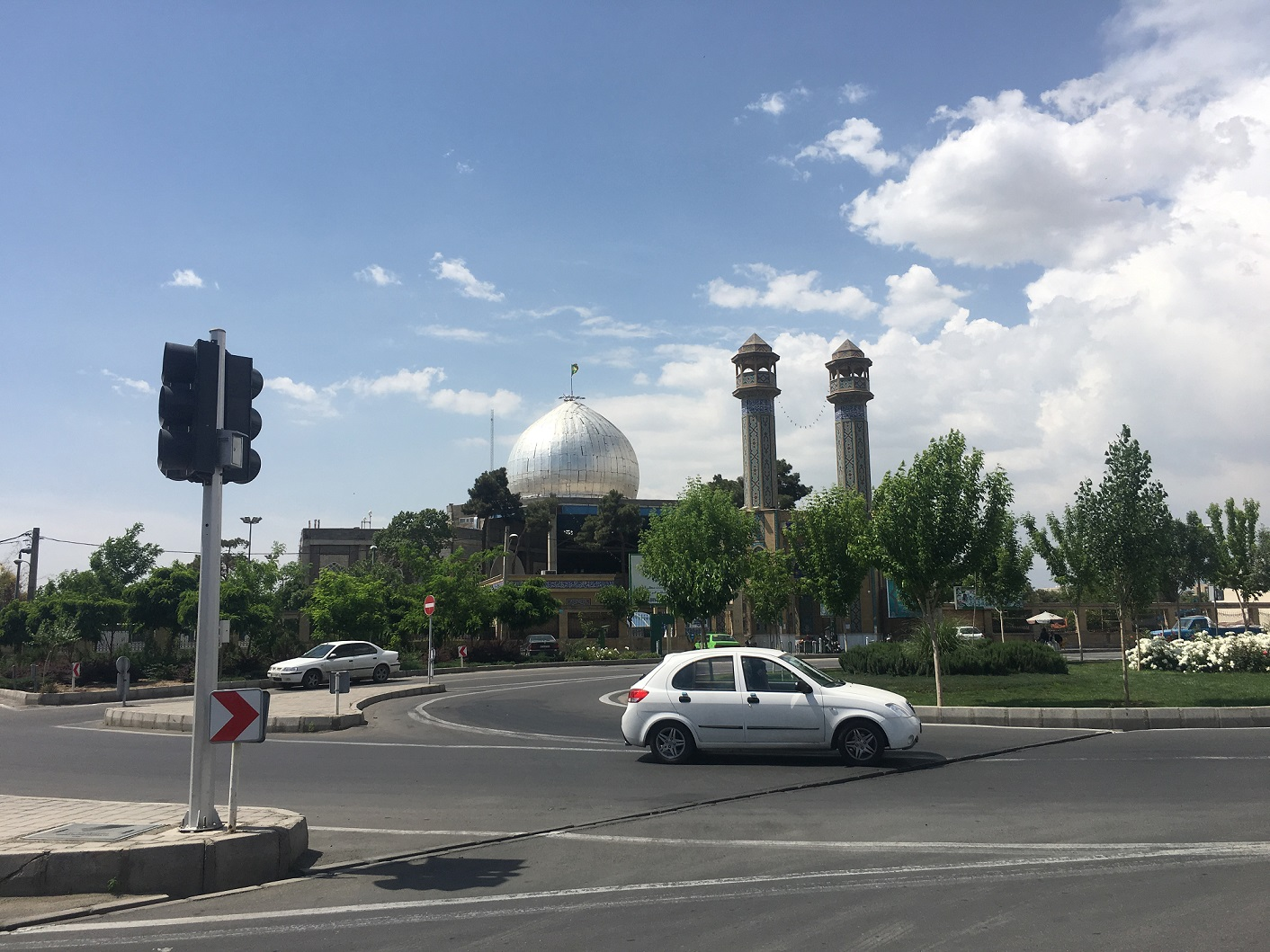
Ibn Babawayh Cemetery, named after Shia scholar Ibn Babawayh, in Ray.

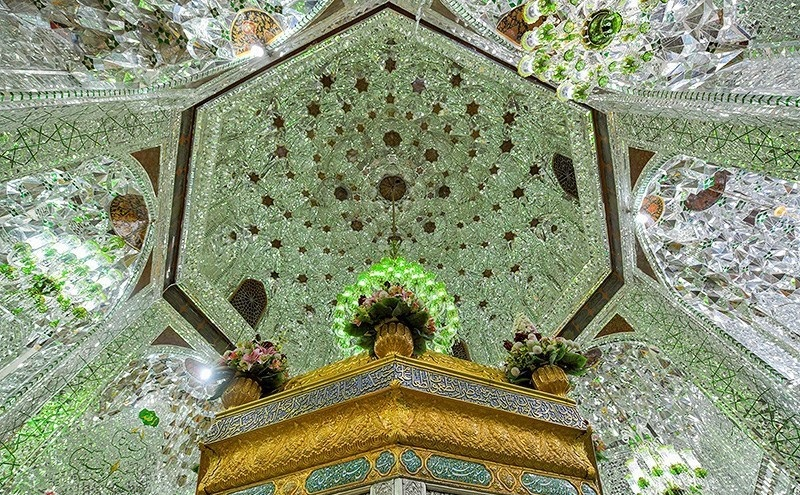
A view of Abd al-Azim al-Hasani shrine in Ray

== See also ==
- Behesht-e Zahra Cemetery
- Ibn Babawayh Cemetery
- Javan Mard-e Ghassab Tomb
- Safayieh Garden

== Sources ==
- Alizadeh, Abbas (1990). "Čašma(-ye) ʿAlī". In Yarshater, Ehsan (ed.). Encyclopædia Iranica. Vol. V/1: Carpets XV–C̆ehel Sotūn, Isfahan. London and New York: Routledge & Kegan Paul. pp. 38–39. ISBN 978-0-939214-66-2.
- Baghbidi, Hassan Rezai (2016). "The Linguistic History of Rayy up to the Early Islamic Period". Der Islam. 93 (2). De Gruyter: 403–412. doi:10.1515/islam-2016-0034.
- Boyce, Mary (1989). "Bībī Šahrbānū". In Yarshater, Ehsan (ed.). Encyclopædia Iranica. Vol. IV/2: Behruz–Bibliographies II. London and New York: Routledge & Kegan Paul. p. 198. ISBN 978-0-71009-125-3.
- de Planhol, Xavier (2004). "Tehran i. a Persian city at the Foot of the Alborz". Encyclopædia Iranica, online edition. New York.
- Duchesne-Guillemin, Jacques (1994). "Deipnosophistaí". In Yarshater, Ehsan (ed.). Encyclopædia Iranica. Vol. VII/3: Dehqān I–Deylam, John of. London and New York: Routledge & Kegan Paul. pp. 227–229. ISBN 978-1-56859-021-9.
- Eilers, W.; Bazin, M.; Bromberger, C.; Thompson, D. (1983). "Abrīšam". Encyclopædia Iranica, online edition, Vol. I, Fasc. 3. New York. pp. 229–247.
- Hillenbrand, R. (1986). "Architecture vi. Safavid to Qajar Periods". In Yarshater, Ehsan (ed.). Encyclopædia Iranica. Vol. II/4: Architecture IV–Armenia and Iran IV. London and New York: Routledge & Kegan Paul. pp. 345–349. ISBN 978-0-71009-104-8.
- Kosmin, Paul J. (2013). "Alexander the Great and the Seleucids in Iran". In Potts, Daniel T. (ed.). The Oxford Handbook of Ancient Iran. Oxford University Press. doi:10.1093/oxfordhb/9780199733309.013.0045.
- Minorsky, V. & Bosworth, C.E. (1971). "al-Rayy". In Lewis, B.; Ménage, V. L.; Pellat, Ch. & Schacht, J. (eds.). The Encyclopaedia of Islam, Second Edition. Volume III: H–Iram. Leiden: E. J. Brill. pp. 471–473. OCLC 495469525.
- Olbrycht, Marek Jan (2010). "Mithradates I of Parthia and His Conquests up to 141 B.C.": 229–245.
- Overtoom, Nikolaus Leo (2020). Reign of Arrows: The Rise of the Parthian Empire in the Hellenistic Middle East. Oxford: Oxford University Press. ISBN 978-0190888329.
- Rante, Rocco (2000). "Ray i. Archeology". Encyclopædia Iranica, online edition. New York.
- Rante, Rocco (2015). Rayy: from its Origins to the Mongol Invasion: An Archaeological and Historiographical Study. Brill. ISBN 978-90-04-27929-2.
- Scarce, J. M. (1986). "Art in Iran x.1 Art and Architecture of the Qajar Period". In Yarshater, Ehsan (ed.). Encyclopædia Iranica. Vol. II/6: Art in Iran I–ʿArūż. London and New York: Routledge & Kegan Paul. pp. 627–637. ISBN 978-0-71009-106-2.
- Shahbazi, A. Sh. (1987). "Astōdān". In Yarshater, Ehsan (ed.). Encyclopædia Iranica. Vol. II/8: Aśoka IV–Āṯār al-Wozarāʾ. London and New York: Routledge & Kegan Paul. pp. 851–853. ISBN 978-0-71009-108-6.
- Shahbazi, A. Sh. (1988). "Bahrām VI Čōbīn". In Yarshater, Ehsan (ed.). Encyclopædia Iranica. Vol. III/5: Bahai Faith III–Baḵtīārī tribe II. London and New York: Routledge & Kegan Paul. pp. 514–522. ISBN 978-0-71009-117-8.
- Shahbazi, A. Sh.; Bosworth, C.E. (1990). "Capital Cities". In Yarshater, Ehsan (ed.). Encyclopædia Iranica. Vol. IV/7: Calendars II–Cappadocia. London and New York: Routledge & Kegan Paul. pp. 768–774. ISBN 978-0-71009-130-7.
- Shahbazi, A. Sh. (1991). "Charax". In Yarshater, Ehsan (ed.). Encyclopædia Iranica. Vol. V/4: C̆es̆tīya–Chinese-Iranian relations VIII. London and New York: Routledge & Kegan Paul. pp. 365–366. ISBN 978-0-939214-71-6.
- Shahvar, Soli (2008). "Railroads i. The First Railroad Built and Operated in Persia". Encyclopædia Iranica, online edition. New York.
- Strootman, Rolf (2015). "Seleucid empire". Encyclopædia Iranica, online edition. New York.

== Notes ==
Preceded by Nishapur	Capital of Seljuk Empire (Persia); 1043–1051	Succeeded by Isfahan
