= Cheshmeh-Ali (Shahr-e-Rey) =

Iranian national heritage site

Cheshmeh-Ali چشمه علی
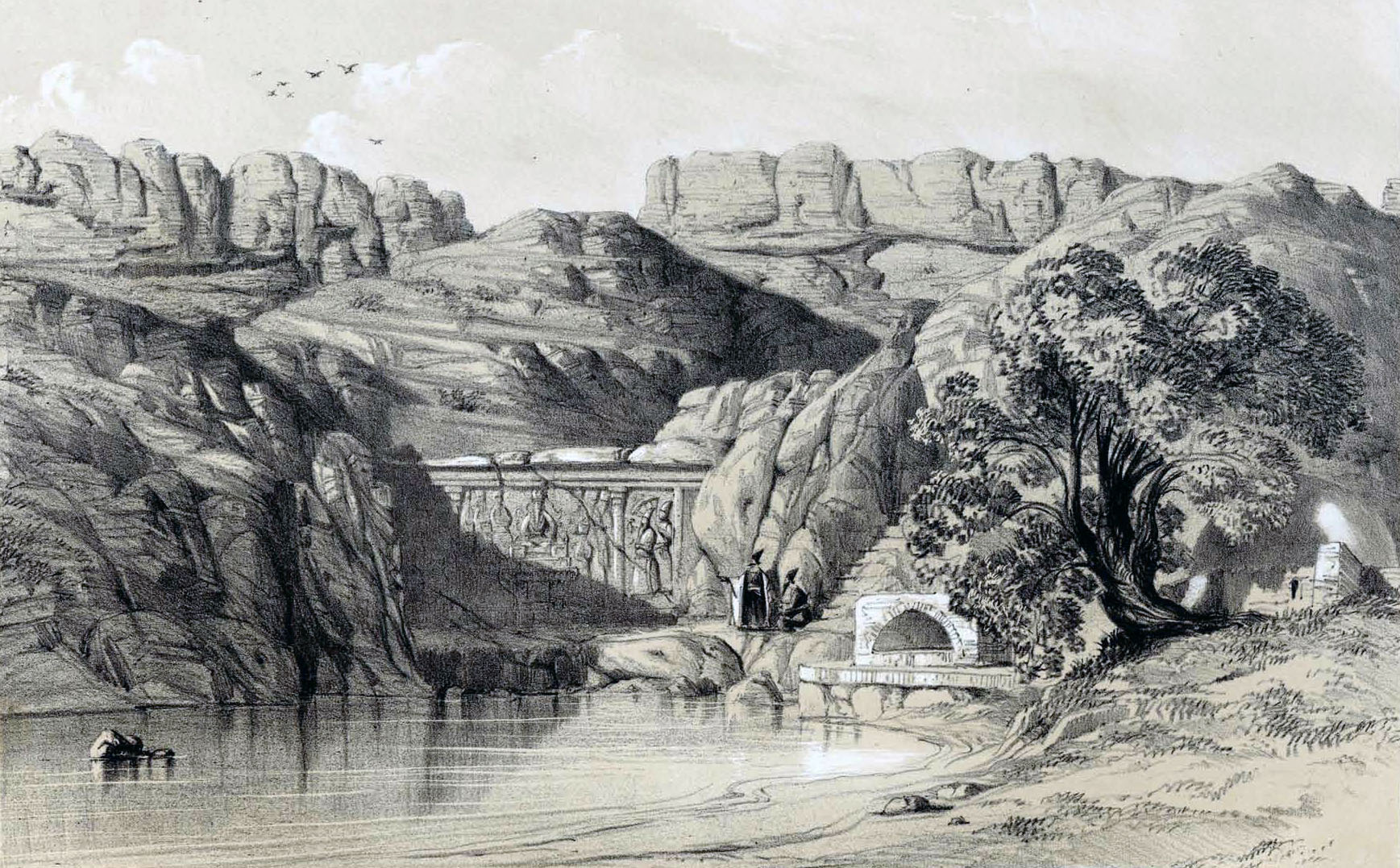
- Cheshmeh Ali by Eugène Flandin

- Location within Iran
- 35°36′25″N 51°26′44″E
- Location: Ray, Iran

Iran National Heritage List
- Official name: Cheshmeh-Ali
- Type: Archaeological Site
- Designated: 1934
- Reference no.: 202
- Conservation organization: Cultural Heritage, Handicrafts and Tourism Organization of Iran

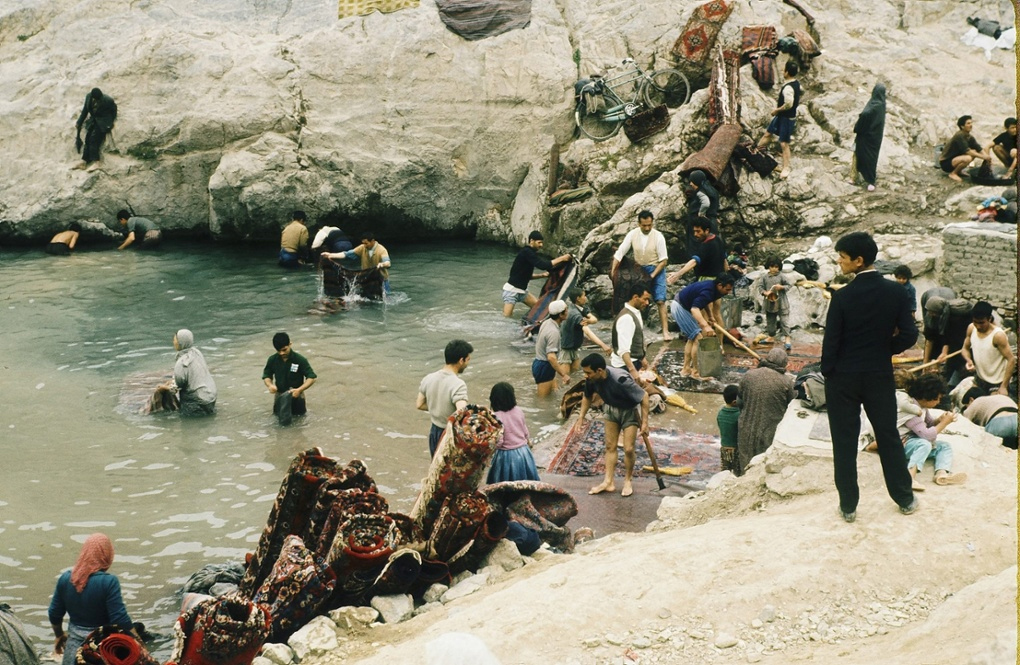
Iranians washing and rolling carpets - 1960

Cheshmeh-Ali (Persian: چشمه‌علی; 'Spring of Ali') is an ancient recreational place, located in the south of Tehran and north of Rey or Ray in the country of Iran. The spring is spot in the neighborhood of Ebn-e Babooyeh, Tughrul Tower, and below the Rashkan castle and next to Rey Castle and Fath Ali shah inscription.

== History ==
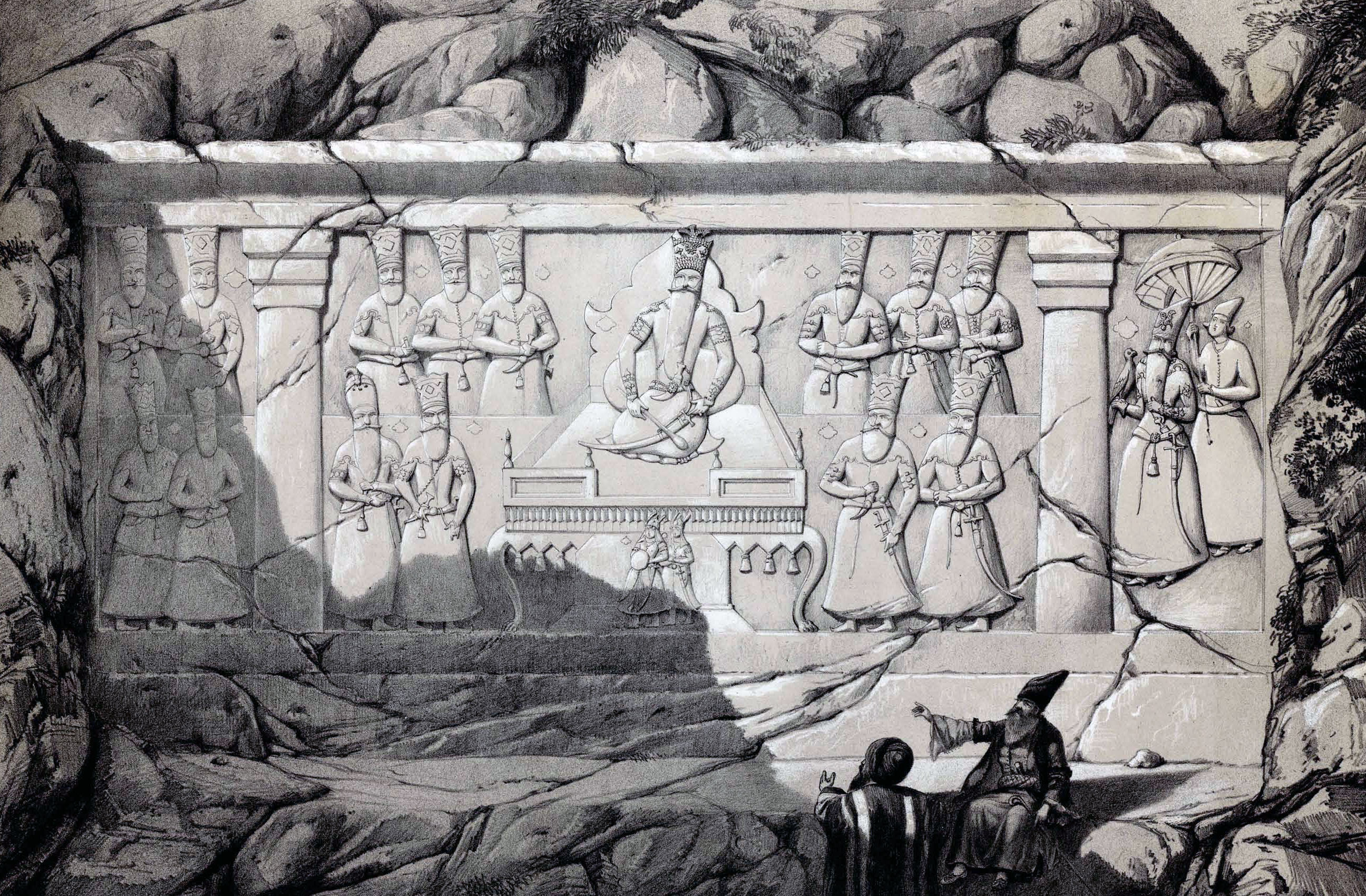
A relief of Feth Ali Shah at Cheshmeh-Ali, near Tehran (illustration by Eugène Flandin in 1840)

== Archaeology ==
Cheshmeh Ali is a small Late Neolithic and Chalcolithic settlement located within the suburbs of modern-day Tehran, south of the Elburz mountains. It was excavated by Erich Schmidt in 1934-1936 for the University Museum in Philadelphia, also sponsored by the Boston Museum of Fine Arts. At that time, the site was far from Tehran. When Schmidt died in 1964, his work remained mostly unpublished.

Originally, Donald E. McCown offered three successive painted pottery traditions for northern Iran: the Sialk horizon, the Cheshmeh Ali horizon, and the Hissar horizon. The ceramic sequence at Cheshmeh Ali shows two millennia of occupation from the Late Neolithic through the Late Chalcolithic.

The Cheshmeh Ali cultural complex generally defines a Transitional Chalcolithic on the Iranian Central Plateau dating between 5500 and 4800 BC. Cheshmeh Ali ware is dated ca. 5500 BC. This painted pottery, also known as "Ismailabad ware", is found across northern Persia as far west as the area around Kashan, near Isfahan, and Qazvin to the north of there.

Yet recent reexcavation of Cheshmeh Ali has also documented an earlier occupational phase. Chaff-tempered Neolithic soft-ware ceramics are also found here. These are usually decorated with painted geometric designs, and also have parallels to the early Sialk I material.

Two examples of the so-called Cheshmeh Ali ware, dating to the 6th-5th millennium BCE.

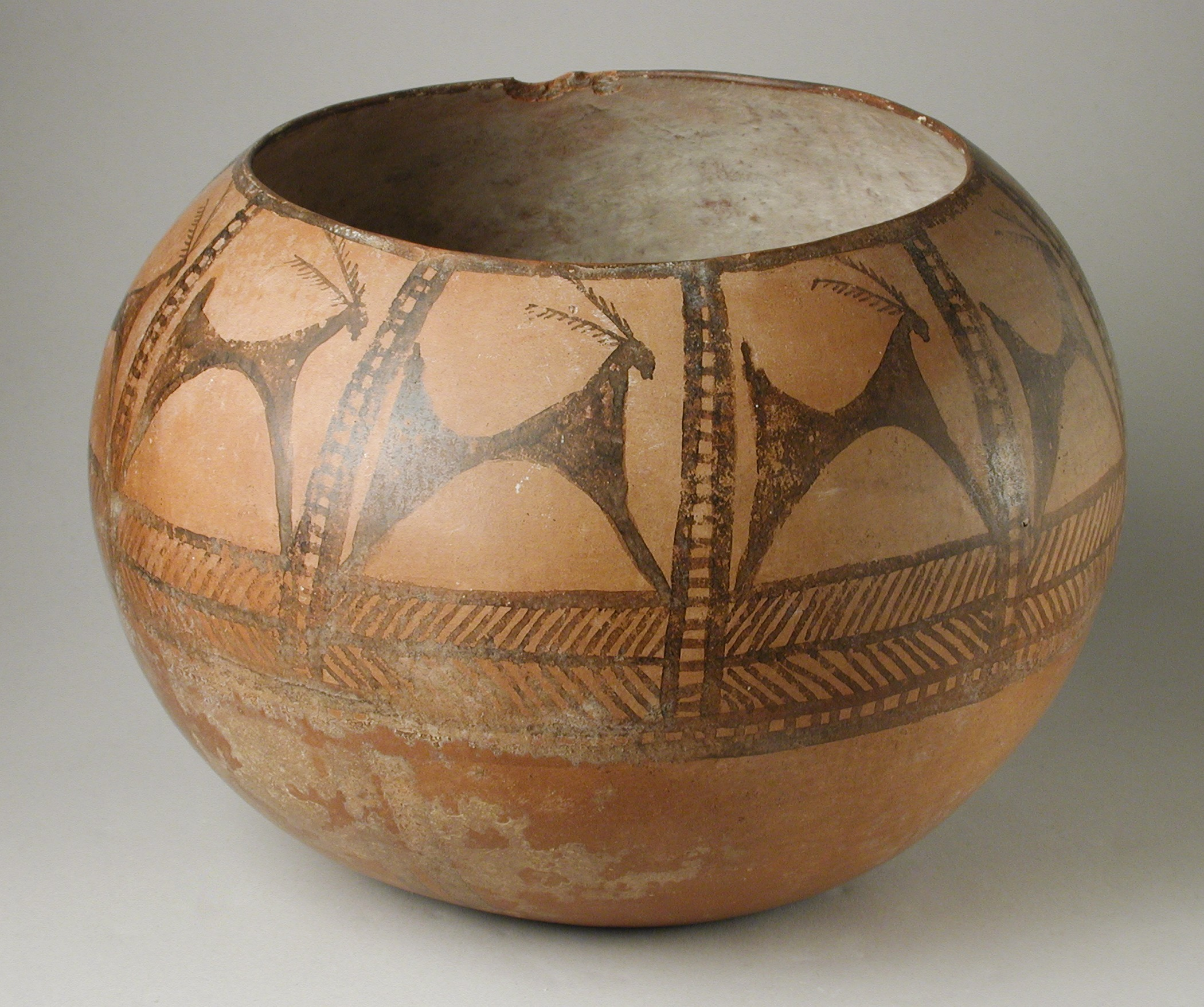
Prehistoric Painted Pottery Vessel from Cheshmeh Ali. c. 5000-4500 BC - LACMA

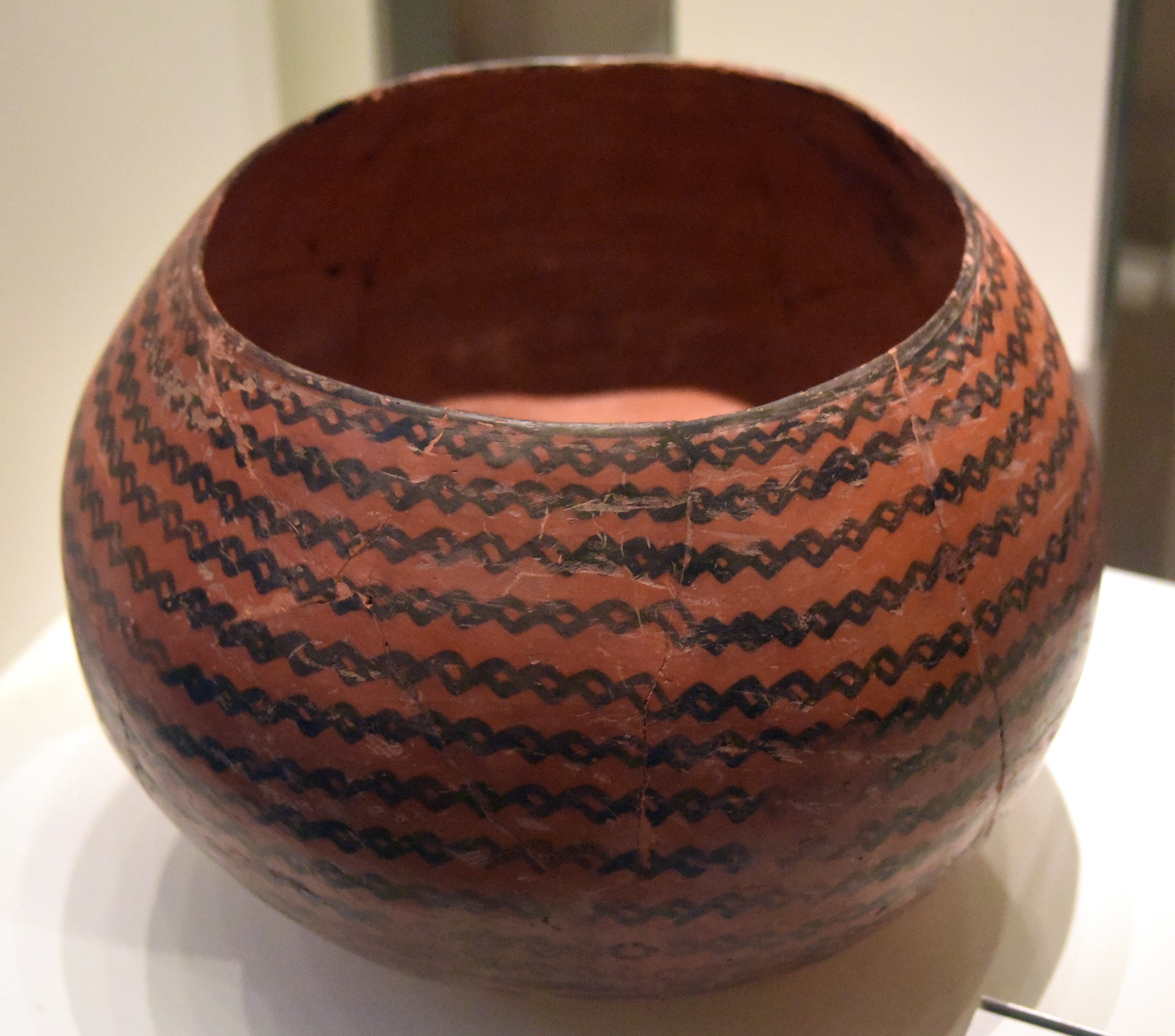
Pottery bowl, Cheshmeh Ali ware, 5500-4500 BC

== See also ==
- Tappeh Cheshmeh Ali

== Bibliography ==
- Coningham, R. A., Fazeli, N. H., Young, R. and Donahue, R. (2004) “Location, Location, Location: A pilot Survey of the Tehran plain in 2003” Iran 42: 1-12.
- Fazeli, N. H., Coningham, R. A. E. and Batt, C. M. (2004) “Cheshmeh-Ali revisited: Towards an absolute dating of the Late Neolithic and Chalcolithic of Iran's Tehran Plain” Iran 42: 13-23.
- Matney, T. (1995) “Re-excavating Cheshmeh Ali and Notes from the Field, 1934-1936” Expedition 37(2): 26-38.
- Wong, E., C.A. Petrie, and H. Fazeli (2010) “Cheshmeh-Ali Ware: A Petrographic and Geochemical Study of Transitional Chalcolithic Period Ceramic Industry on the North Central Plateau of Iran” Iran 48: 11-26.
