= Fath Ali Shah Inscription (Cheshmeh-Ali) =

Historic inscriptions in Rey, Iran

Fath Ali Shah inscription
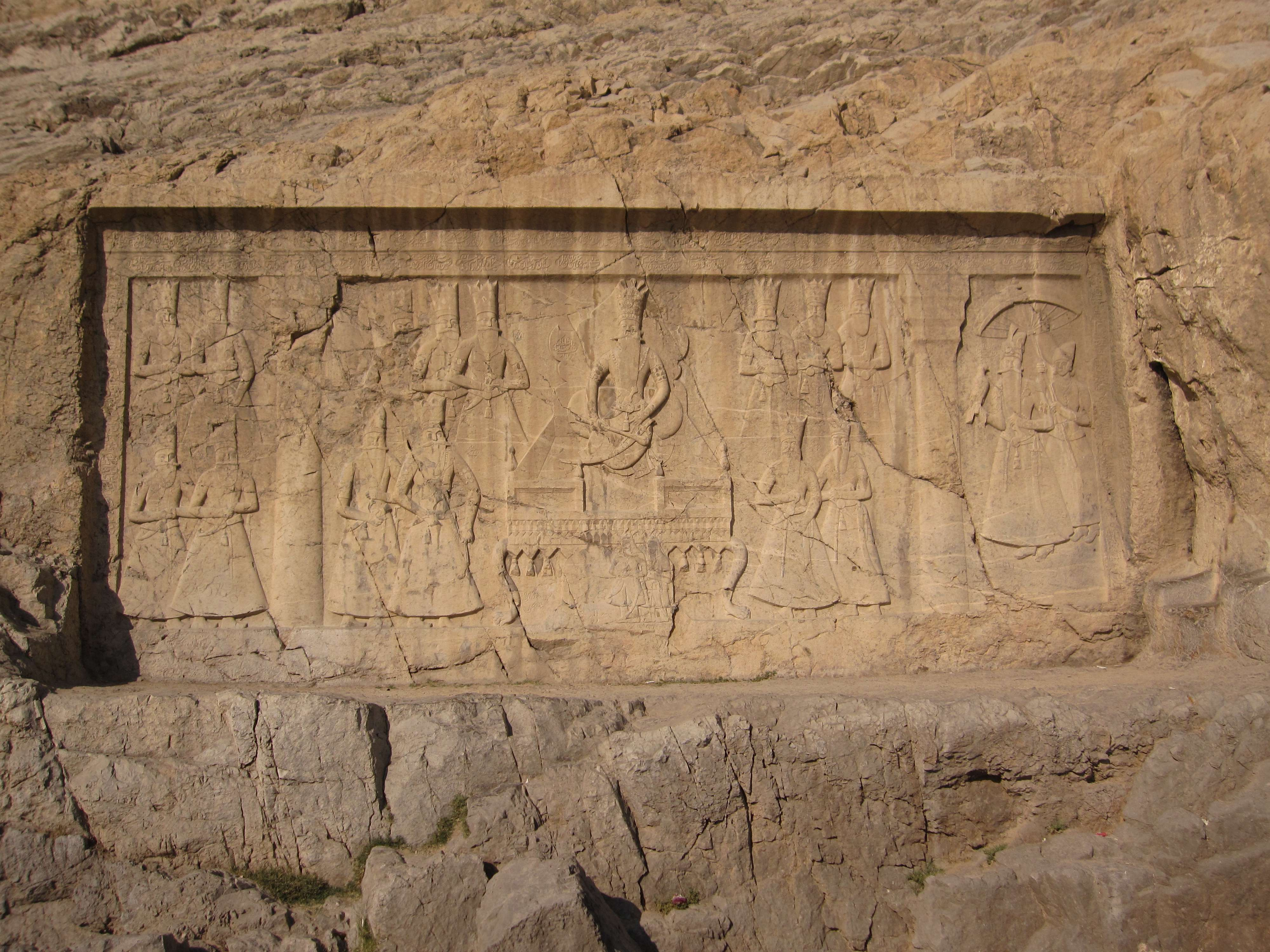
- Interactive map of Fath Ali Shah inscription
- Location: Cheshmeh-Ali (Shahr-e-Rey), Tehran province, Iran
- Designer: Abdallah Khan
- Material: Granite
- Length: 12m
- Height: 5m
- Completion date: 1830
- Dedicated to: Fath-Ali Shah Qajar

Fath Ali Shah inscription (Persian: کتیبه فتحعلی‌شاه, romanized: Katibeh-ye Fath-Ali Shah) is located in Cheshmeh-Ali in Rey, Iran. This work is one of several inscriptions made during the reign of Fath-Ali Shah Qajar. It is located north of Rey near Cheshmeh-Ali park and beneath the Rey Castle.

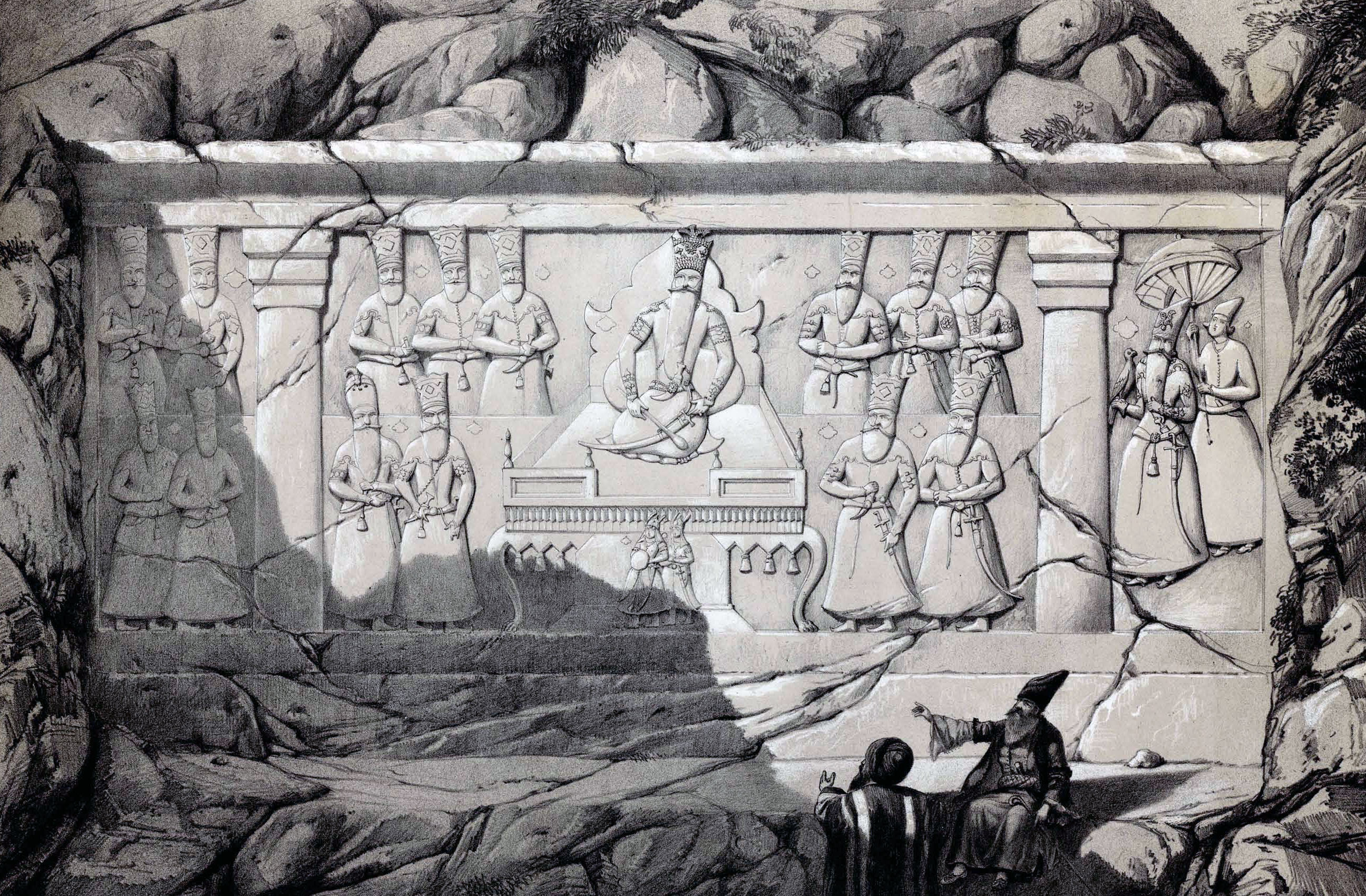
The Fath Ali Shah relief by Eugène Flandin, 1840

Fath-Ali Shah is depicted on the right side of the relief, holding an eagle in his right hand and a sheathed sword in his left. In the middle of the relief, the shah is shown seated on the Sun Throne, wearing the Kiani Crown and holding a mace, while courtiers stand around him. This relief is an example of the revival of Sasanian art during the Qajar era.

== See also ==
- Rashkan Castle
- Tappeh Cheshmeh Ali
- Safayieh Garden
