= Rey Castle =

Castle in Ray, Iranian national heritage site

- Cheshmeh-Ali, Iran
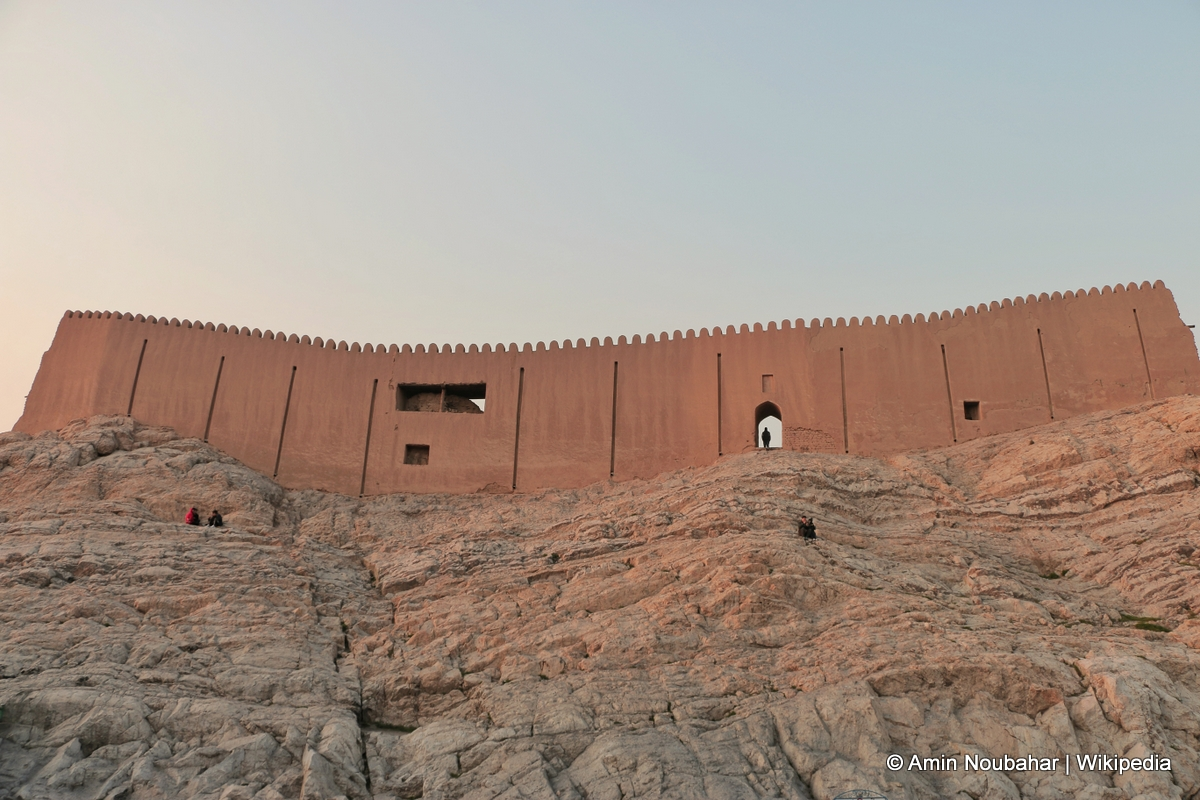
- Rey Castle after modern reconstruction

Site information
- Type: Castle

Location
- Coordinates: 35.6076126°N 51.4449043°E

Rey Castle (Persian: باروی ری) also known as the Rey Fortification or Ghal'eh Rey, was an ancient defensive structure located on a hill above Cheshmeh-Ali in the ancient city of Rey (now a part of modern Greater Tehran), Iran. The fortification dates back to the Median kingdom, over 2,300 years ago, although the settlement of Rey itself has archaeological evidence of continuous habitation since as early as 6000 BCE.

The castle was a significant military and strategic stronghold throughout various Persian empires. During the Sasanian era, it was a major center and home to powerful families like the House of Mehran. While some sources suggest an earthquake ruined a previous structure rebuilt by Seleucus I Nicator during the Seleucid era, the fortifications remained essential to the city's defenses through the Muslim conquest of Persia. By the 19th century, the site was primarily in ruins, and a Qajar era inscription of Fath-Ali Shah was carved into the rock face below the castle ruins in 1831. Modern reconstruction efforts have been undertaken to preserve the remaining structure of this historically significant site.

== Gallery ==
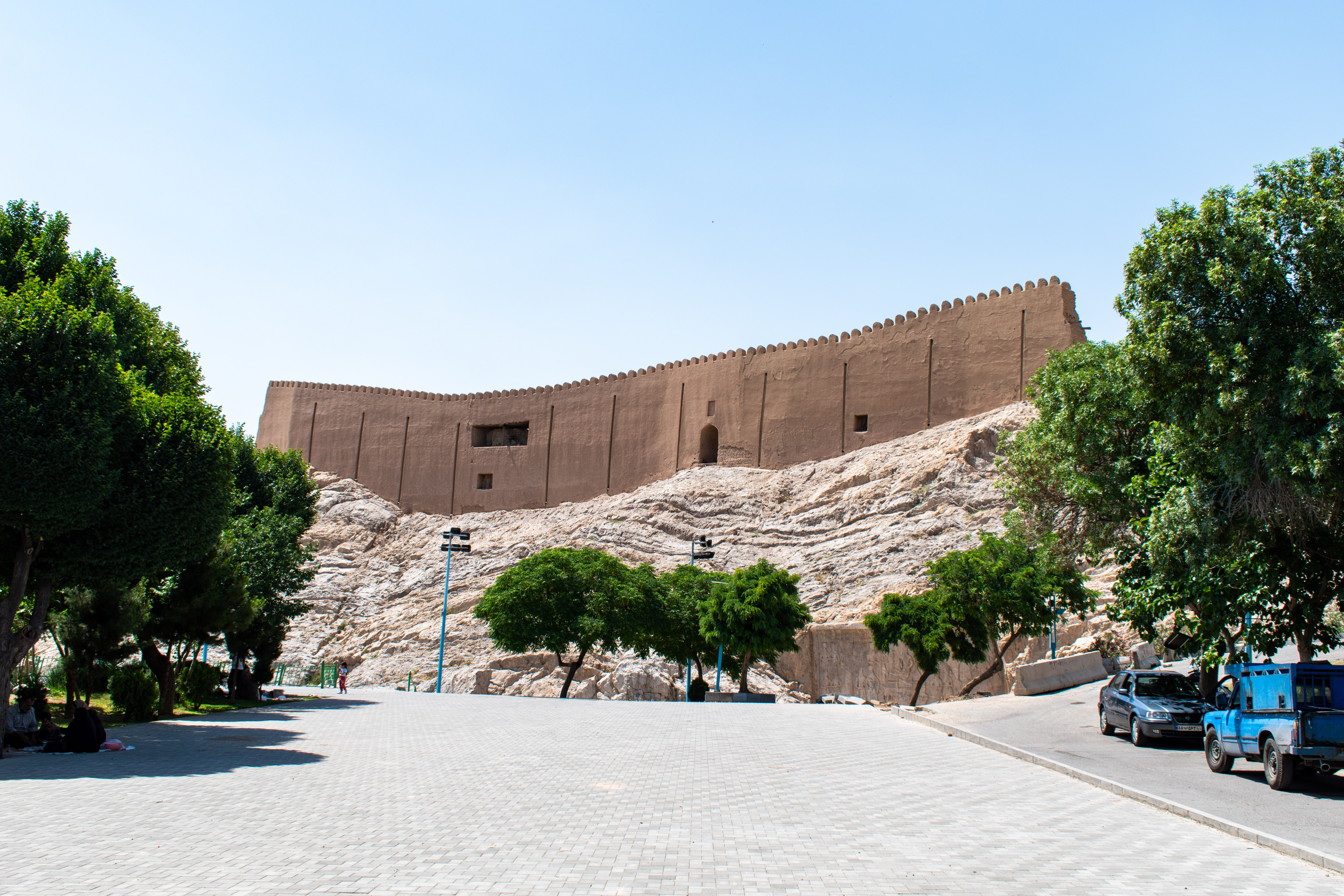

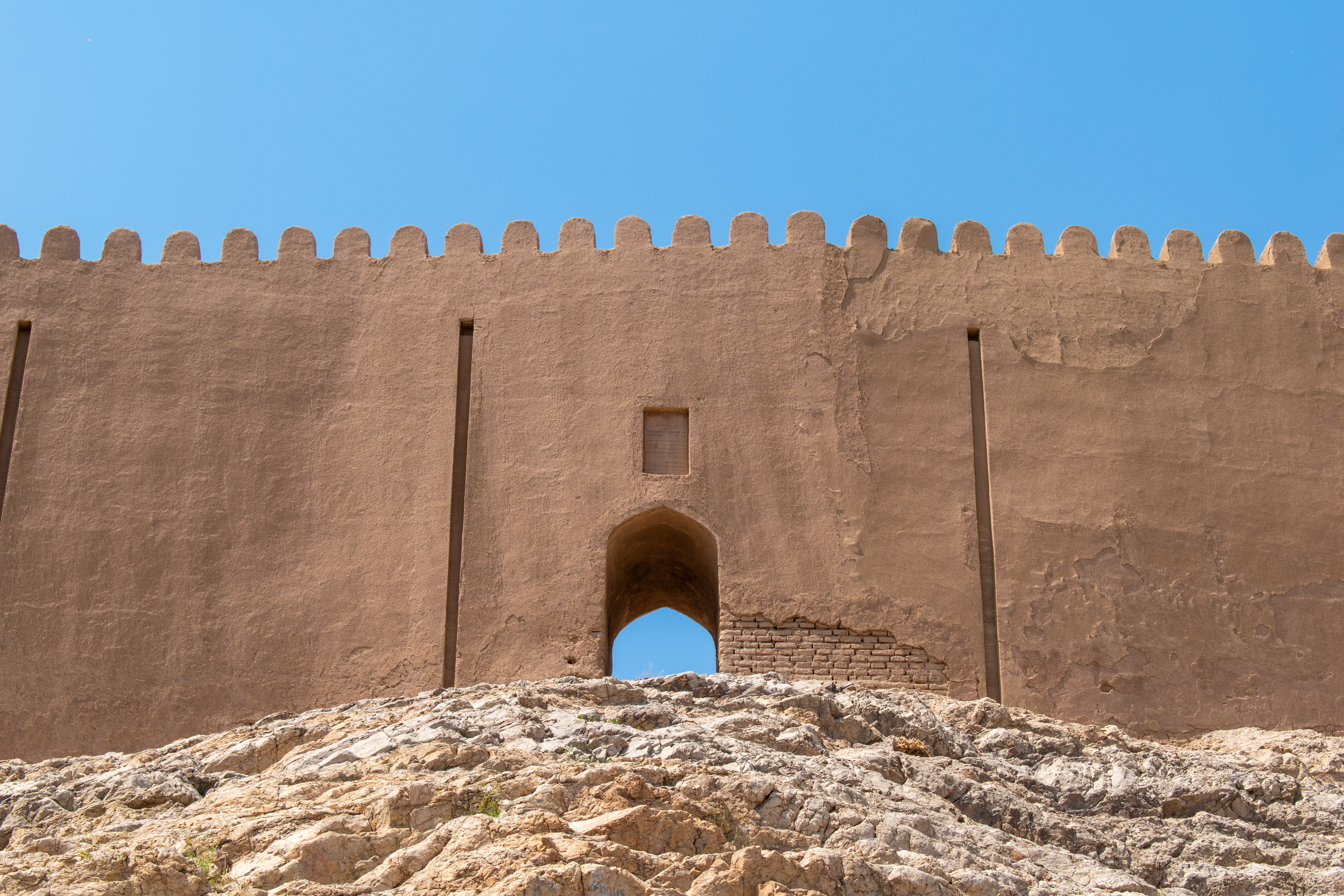

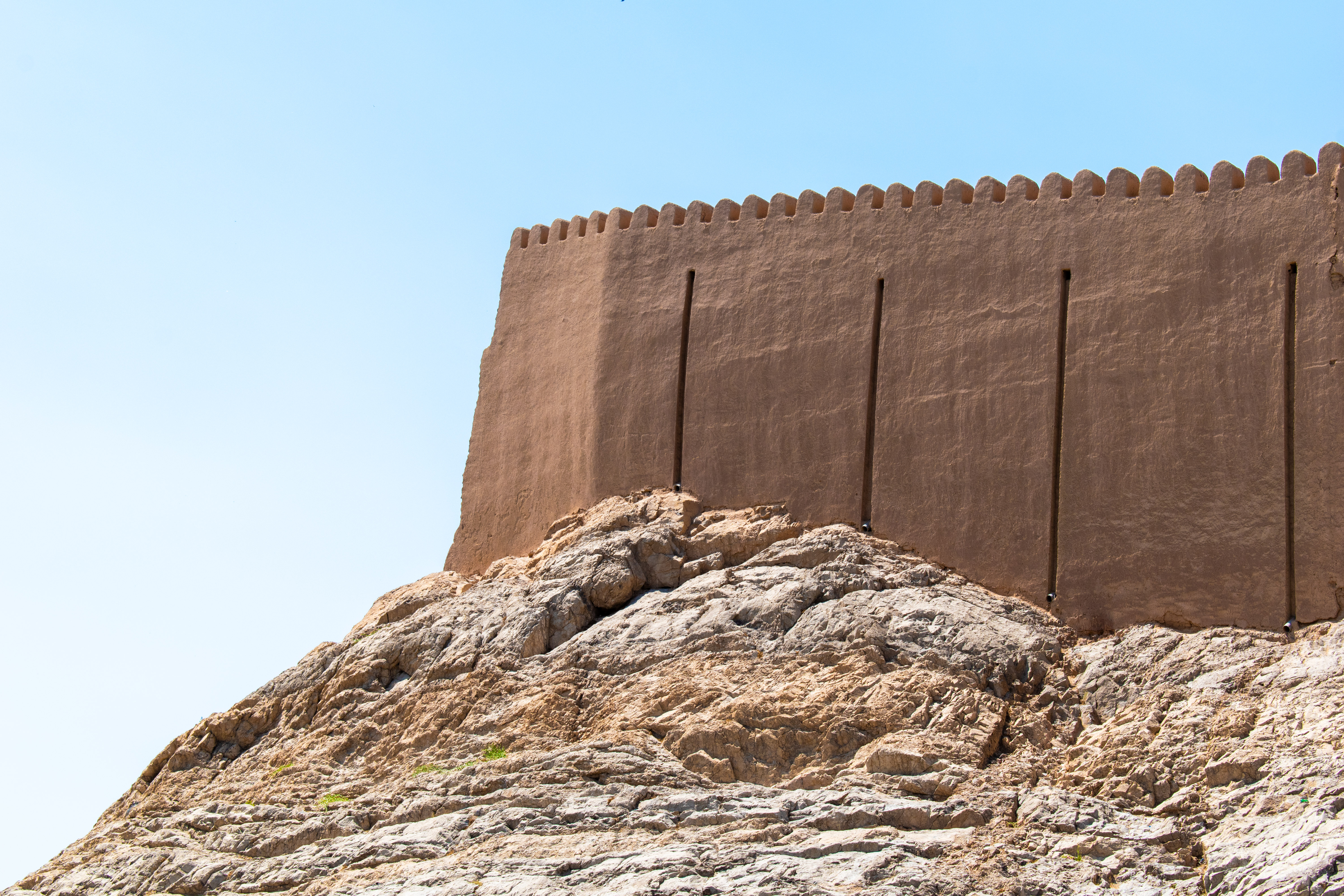

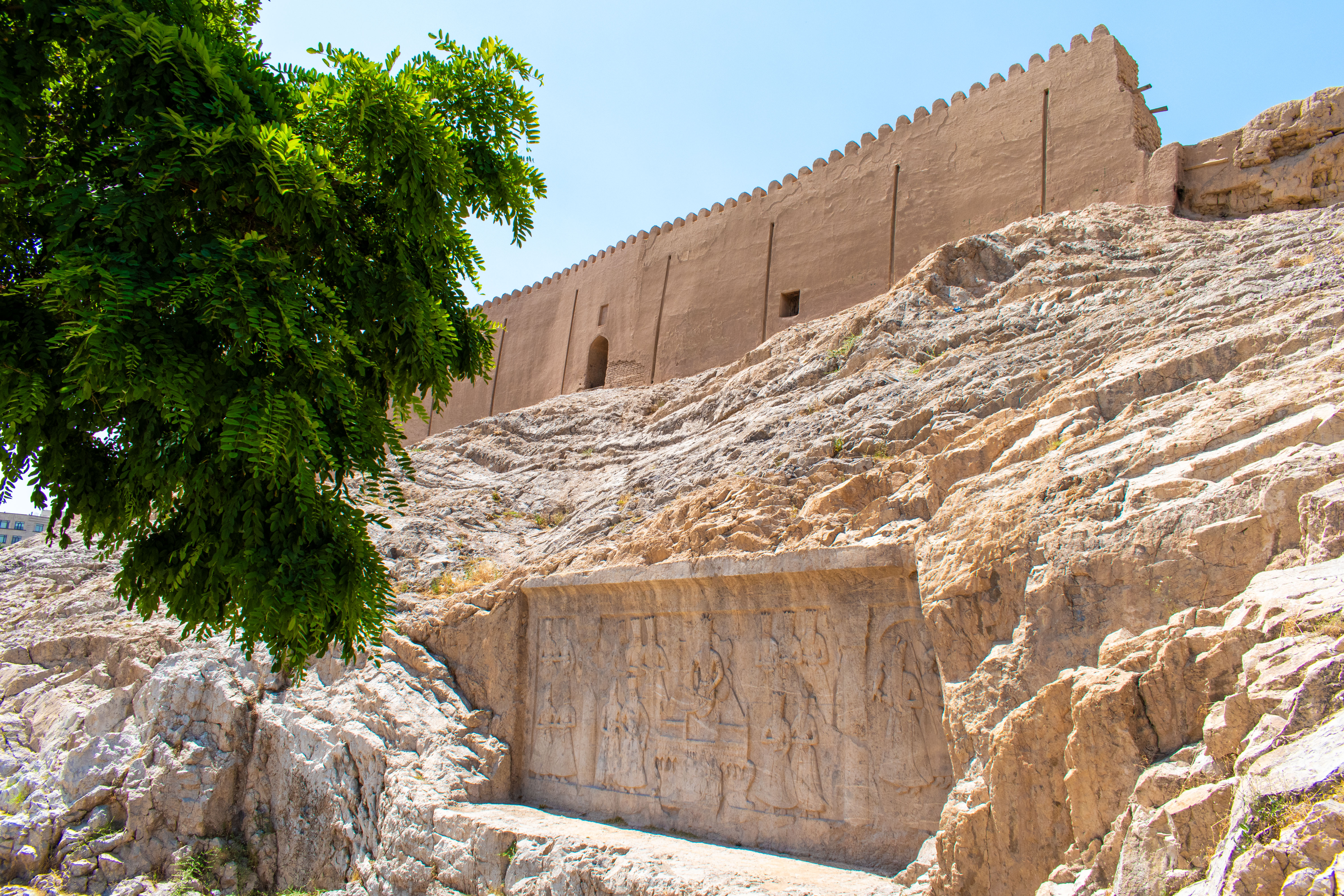

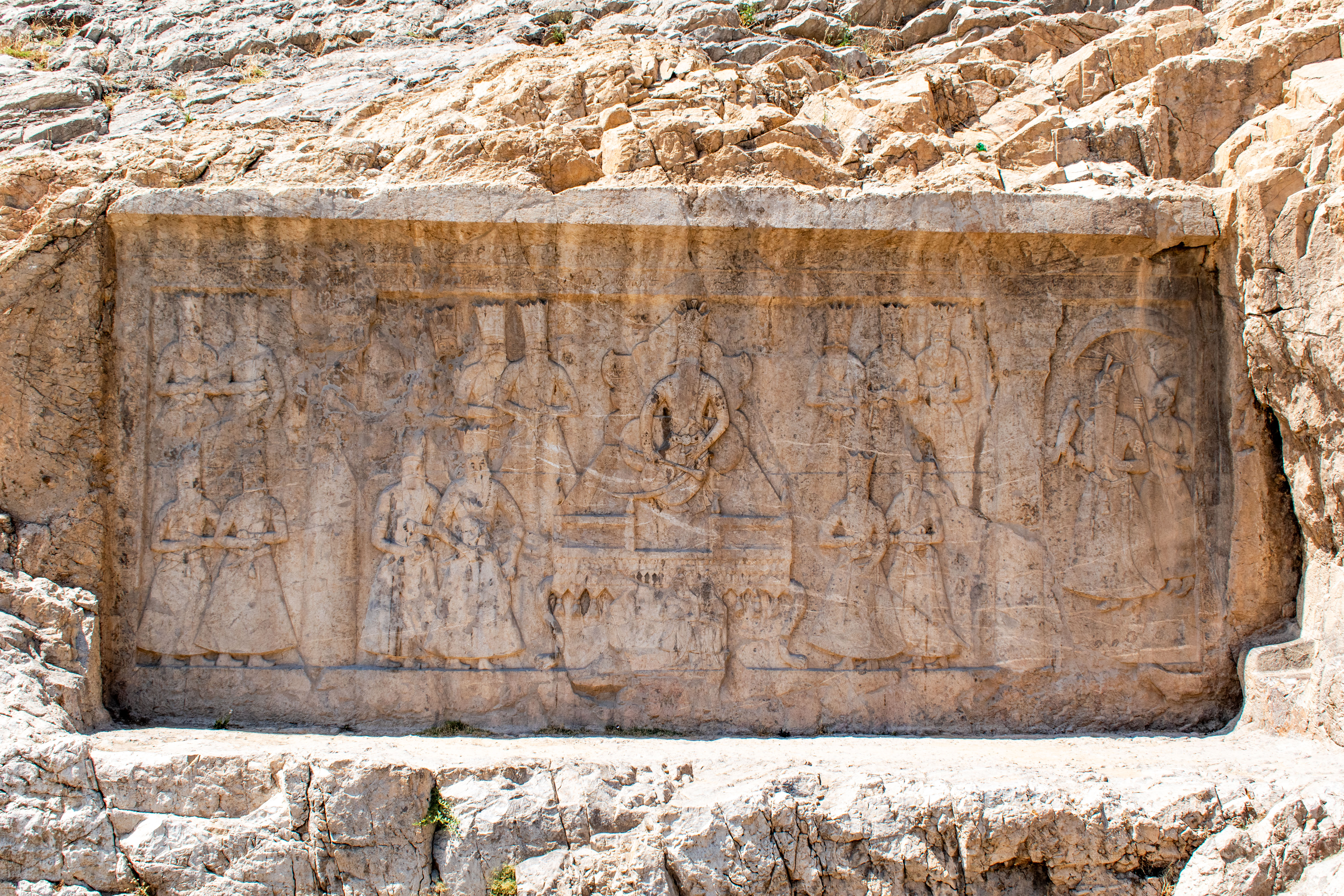
Fath Ali Shah Inscription

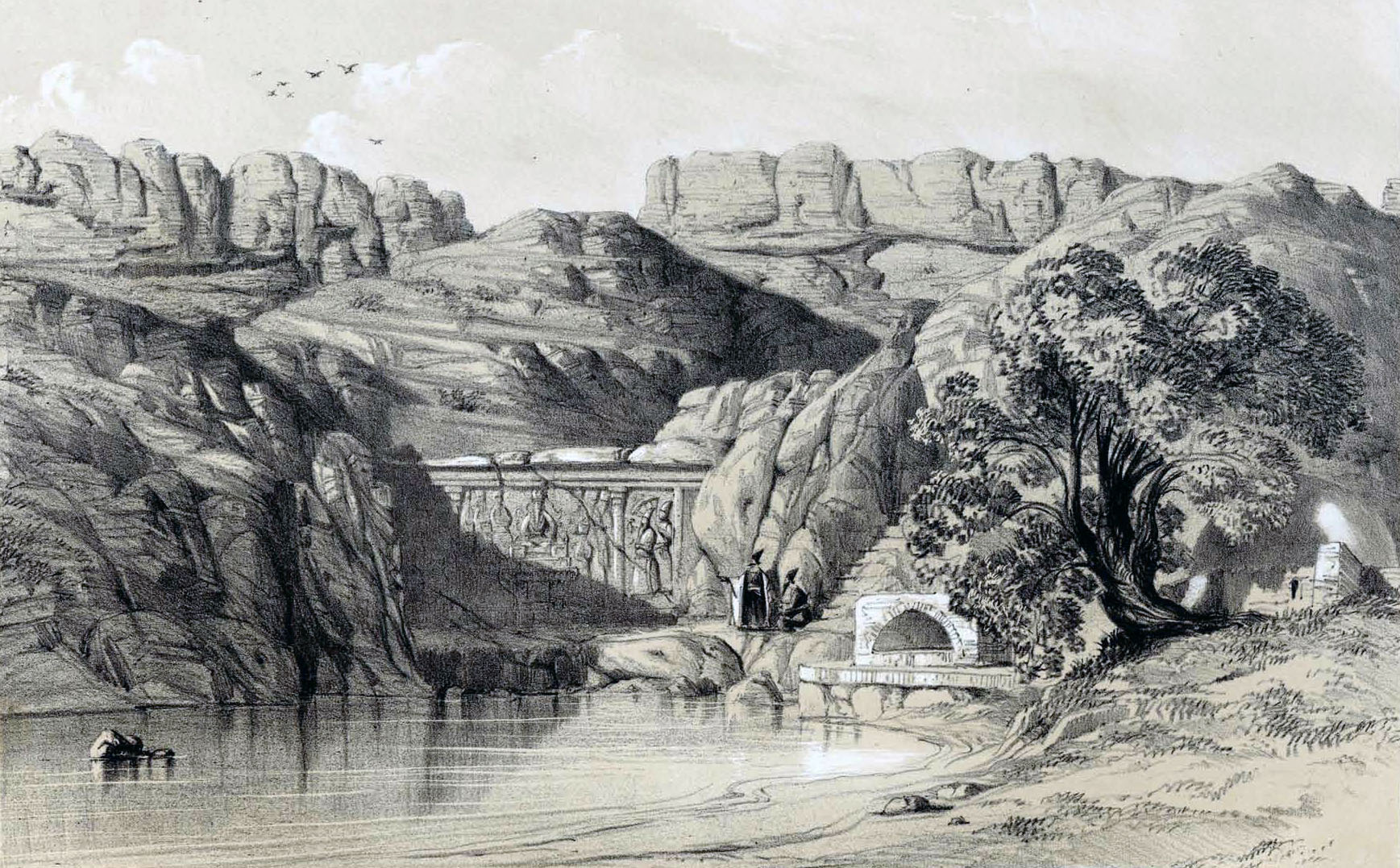
Cheshmeh-Ali, Fath Ali Shah Inscription and Rey Castle by Eugène Flandin

== See also ==
- Safayieh Garden
- Tappeh Cheshmeh Ali
- Rashkan Castle
- Fath Ali Shah Inscription
- Cheshmeh-Ali (Shahr-e-Rey)

== Resources ==
- باروی ری darioush-shahbazi.com Persian Language.
