= Rashkan Castle =

Iranian national heritage site

- دژ رشکان
- Tehran Province in Iran
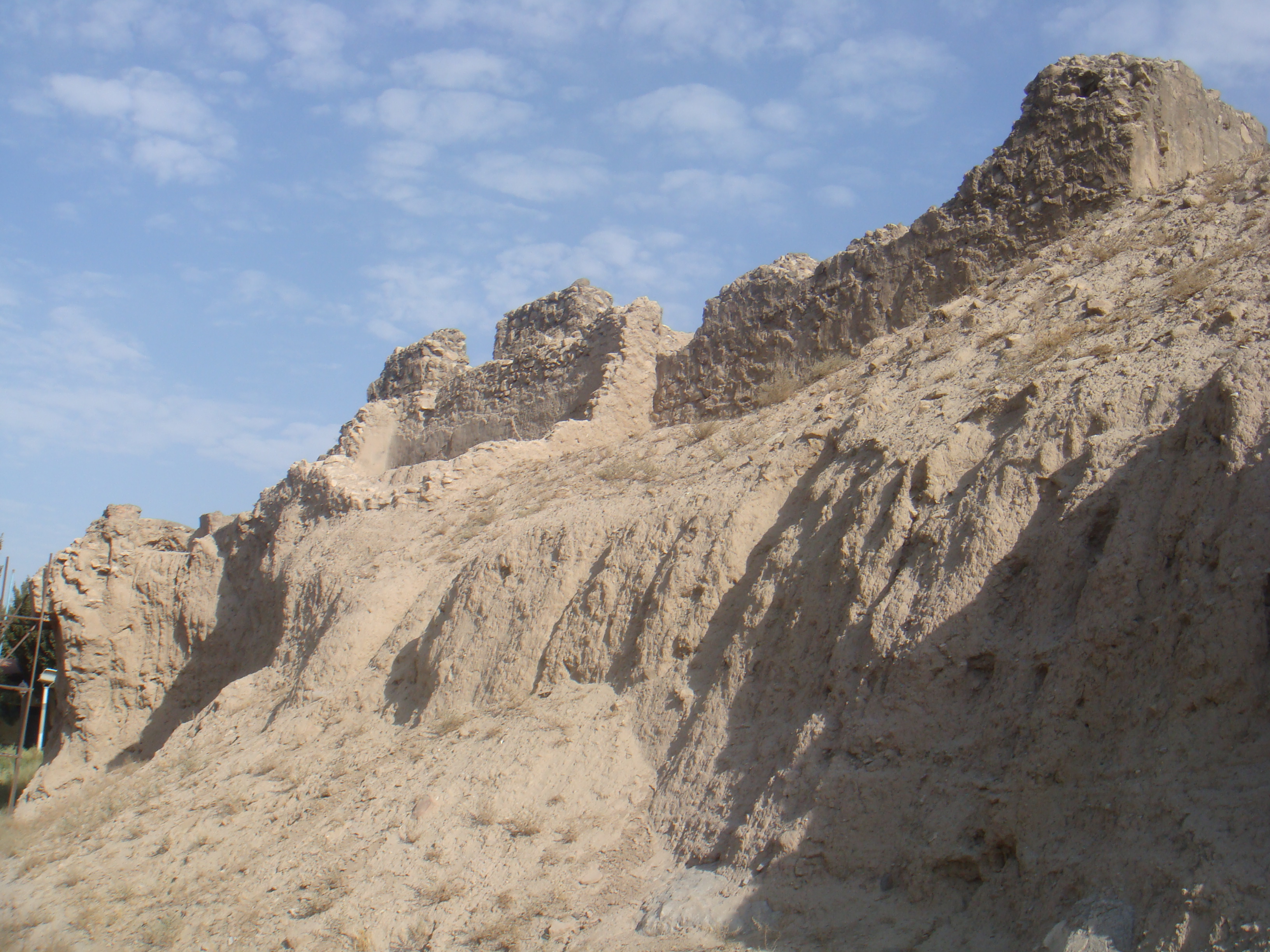
- Southern wall of Rashkan Castle

Site information
- Type: Castle

Location
- Location within Iran
- Coordinates: 35°36′18″N 51°27′01″E
- Height: 5–10 meters

Site history
- Materials: Plaster of lime and ashes or sand with stones

Rashkan Castle (Persian: دژ رشکان, romanized: Dež Rashkan) was a castle in Tehran Province in northern Iran. It was located near Cheshmeh Ali, Shah-Abdol-Azim shrine and Fath Ali shah inscription (Cheshmeh-Ali). It was built during the Parthian rule of Iran.

== Etymology ==
The name comes from Arsaces I of Parthia, the first king of the Parthians. Some of the war items found there are now housed in the National Museum of Iran.

== Gallery ==
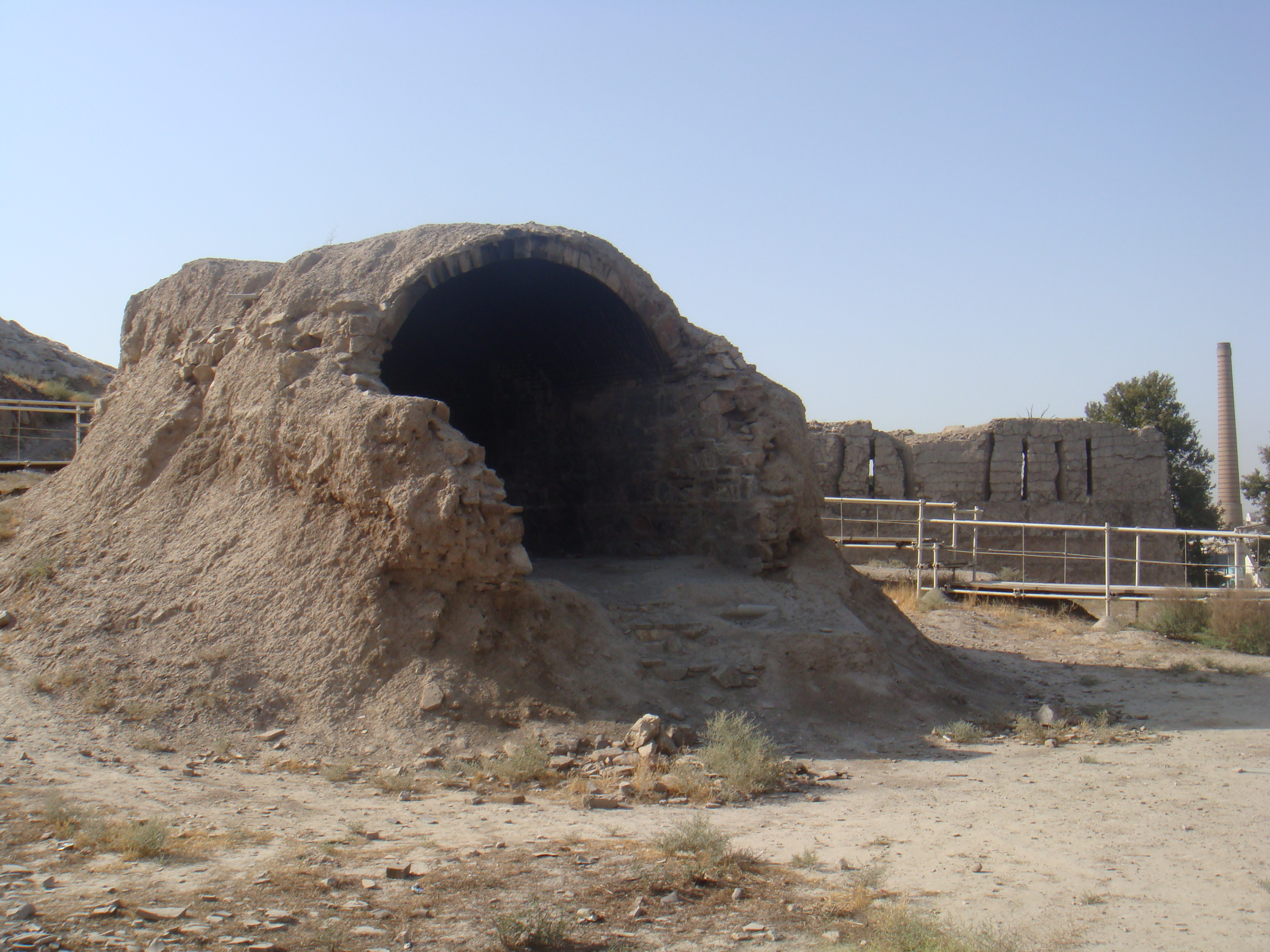

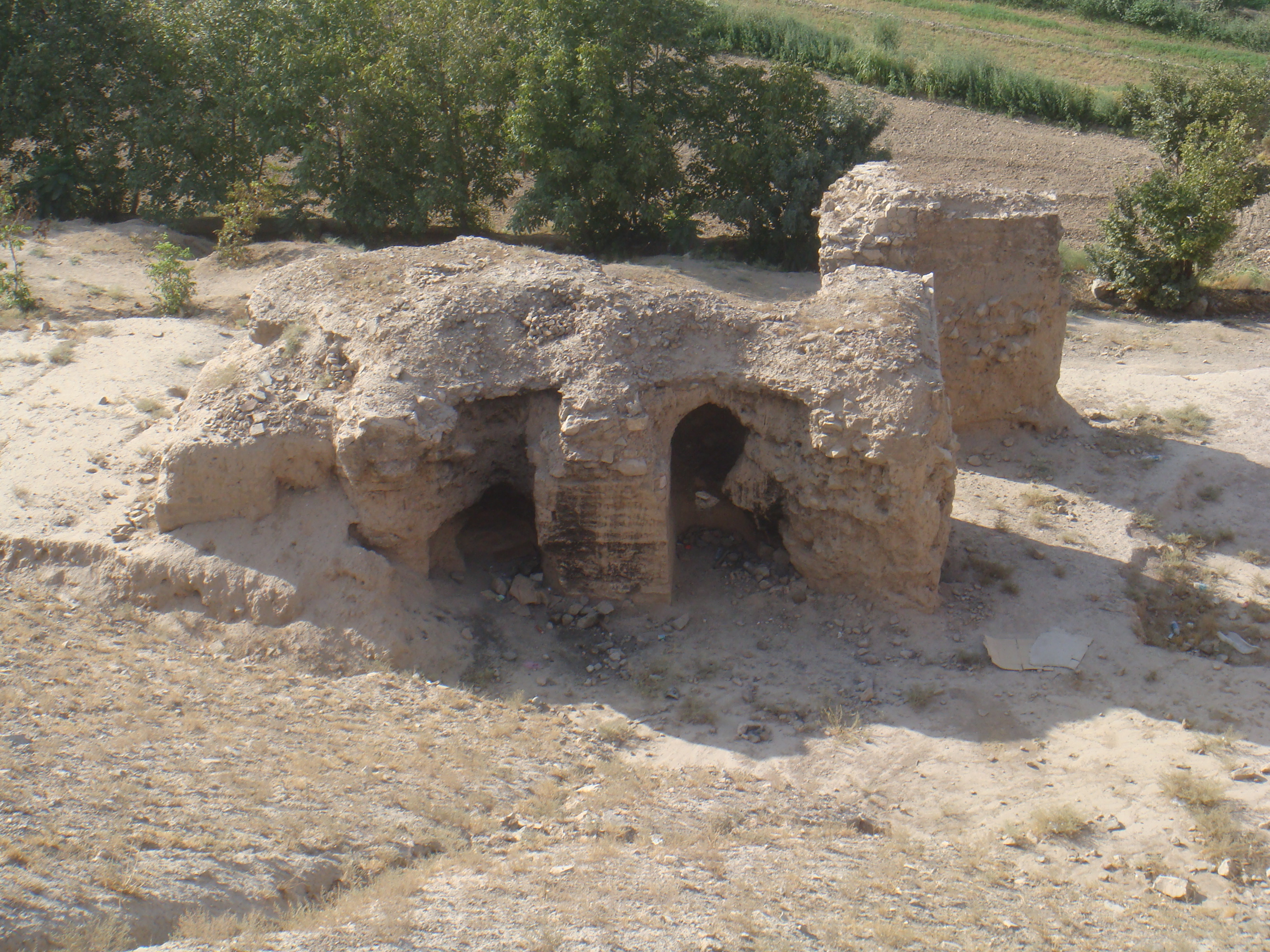

== See also ==
- Rey Castle
- Fath Ali Shah Inscription
