= Amyrgians =

People group

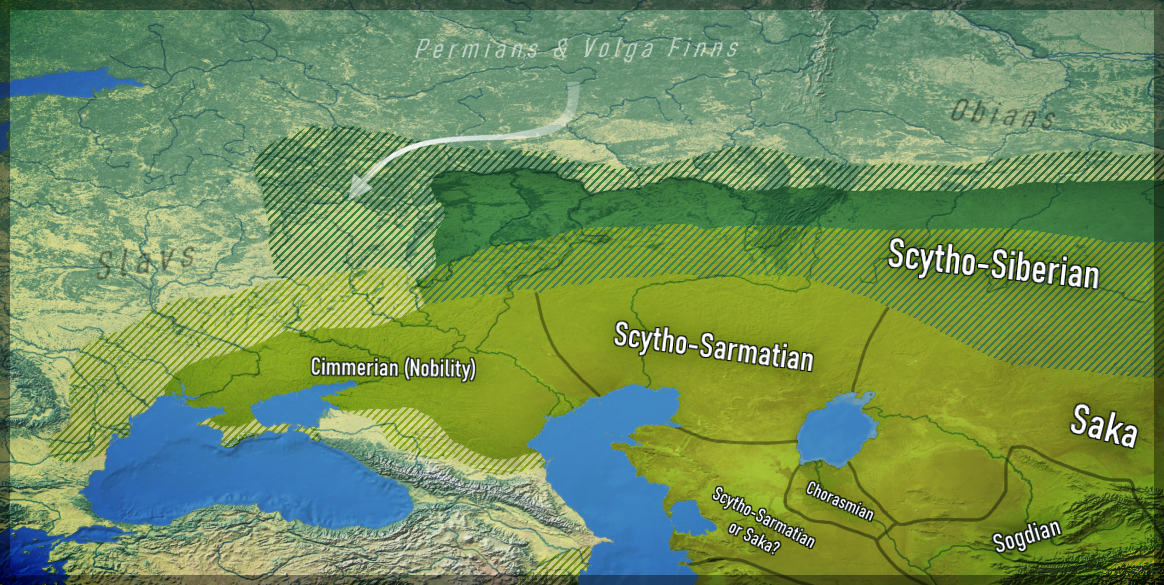
Distribution of Central Asian Iranic populations during the Iron Age.

The Amyrgians (Ancient Greek: Ἀμύργιοι Amúrgioi; Latin: Amyrgii; Old Persian: 𐎿𐎣𐎠 𐏐 𐏃𐎢𐎶𐎺𐎼𐎥𐎠 Sakā haumavargā "Sakas who lay hauma (around the fire)") were a Saka tribe.

== Name ==
The Greek name for this tribe, Amúrgioi (Ἀμύργιοι), is the Hellenised form of the Old Persian term Haumavargā (𐏃𐎢𐎶𐎺𐎼𐎥), meaning "who lay hauma (around the fire)," and can be interpreted as "revering hauma." The full name of this tribe in Persians Achaemenid inscriptions is Sakā haumavargā (𐎿𐎣𐎠 𐏐 𐏃𐎢𐎶𐎺𐎼𐎥𐎠), that is the Sakas who lay hauma (around the fire).

== Identification ==
The country of the Sakā haumavargā may have been the same place named as Mujavant in Indo-Aryan literature, where it appears in close connection with Gandhāra and Bahlika.

== Geography ==
The Sakā haumavargā were always mentioned alongside the Sakā tigraxaudā in ancient Persian inscriptions, implying that the Haumavargā and Tigraxaudā were neighbours, although it is less certain whether the Haumavargā lived to the east or to the west of the Tigraxaudā. The Haumavargā most likely lived somewhere between the Caspian Sea and the Pamir Mountains, and to the north of the Oxus, near the Bactrians and Sogdians, possibly in the region corresponding to modern-day Tashkent or Dushanbe around Fergana, or across a large region stretching from Margiana to the upper Oxus river, or between the Altai and Pamir mountains, or in the territory corresponding to the modern-day Afghan district of Monjan in the upper Kokcha valley.

Based on Herodotus's list of the units of the Achaemenid army, within which the Amyrgii and the Bactrians together were under the command of Hystaspes, the scholar Willem Vogelsang locates the Sakā haumavargā to the immediate north and east of Bactria.

Other possible locations of the Sakā haumavargā include the Fergana valley itself, or both the Fergana and Alay valleys, or the region to the north of the Iaxartes.

== History ==
According to the Greek historian Ctesias, once the Persian Achaemenid Empire's founder, Cyrus, had overthrown the Median king Astyages, the Bactrians accepted him as the heir of Astyages and submitted to him, after which he founded the city of Cyropolis on the Iaxartes river as well as seven fortresses to protect the northern frontier of his empire against the Saka. Cyrus then attacked the Sakā haumavargā, initially defeated them and captured their king, Amorges. After this, Amorges's queen, Sparethra, defeated Cyrus with a large army of both men and women warriors and captured Parmises, the brother-in-law of Cyrus and the brother of his wife Amytis, as well as Parmises's three sons, whom Sparethra exchanged in return for her husband, after which Cyrus and Amorges became allies, and Amorges helped Cyrus conquer Lydia.

Cyrus, accompanied by the Sakā haumavargā of his ally Amorges, later carried out a campaign against the Massagetae/Sakā tigraxaudā in 530 BCE. After Cyrus had been mortally wounded by the Derbices and their Indian allies, Amorges and his Saka army helped the Persian soldiers defeat them. Cyrus told his sons to respect their own mother as well as Amorges above everyone before dying.

== Legacy ==
The name of the Afghan district of Monjan in its Farsi (Monjān), Yidgha (Braγ-ayo) and Kati (Mŕùgul) forms might have been derived from that of the Haumavargā.

== See also ==
- Orthocorybantians
- Indo-Scythians
- Kambojas
- Komedes
- Sogdia
- Skudra

== Sources ==
- Lendering, Jona (1996). "Scythians / Sacae". Livius.org.
- Schmitt, Rüdiger (2003). "HAUMAVARGĀ". Encyclopædia Iranica.
- Schmitt, Rüdiger (2018). "Massagetae". Encyclopædia Iranica.
- Vogelsang, W. J. (1992). The Rise and Organisation of the Achaemenid Empire: The Eastern Iranian Evidence. Leiden, Netherlands; New York City, United States: Brill. ISBN 978-9-004-09682-0.
