= Senoch =

Saint Senoch (French: Sénoch; Latin: Senoc(h)us) was a Taifal abbot and saint, venerated in the Eastern Orthodox Church and Roman Catholic Church. He was born in Tiffauges, in Poitou. He founded a monastery in 536, serving as abbot. They established themselves at a place now called Saint-Senoch, which was the site of some Roman ruins. St. Senoch was famous for his acts of austerity, such as enclosing himself within a four-foot space so narrow that he couldn't move the lower half of his body. This won him the undying love of a vast populace.

Senoch knew both St. Euphronius, Bishop of Tours, and his successor, Saint Gregory of Tours.
