= Taifals =

Historical ethnic group

The dragon-and-pearl device of the shields of the Equites Honoriani Taifali iuniores unit based in Gaul. The dragon was blue, as was the "pearl". The boss was blue and the band around the boss was red. The field was white.

The Taifals or Tayfals (Latin: Taifali, Taifalae or Theifali; French: Taïfales) were a people of Germanic or Sarmatian origin, first documented north of the lower Danube in the mid third century AD. They experienced an unsettled and fragmented history, for the most part in association with various Gothic peoples, and alternately fighting against or for the Romans. In the late fourth century some Taifali were settled within the Roman Empire, notably in western Gaul in the modern province of Poitou. They subsequently supplied mounted units to the Roman army and continued to be a significant source of cavalry for early Merovingian armies. By the sixth century their region of western Gaul had acquired a distinct identity as Thifalia.

== Settlement in Oltenia ==
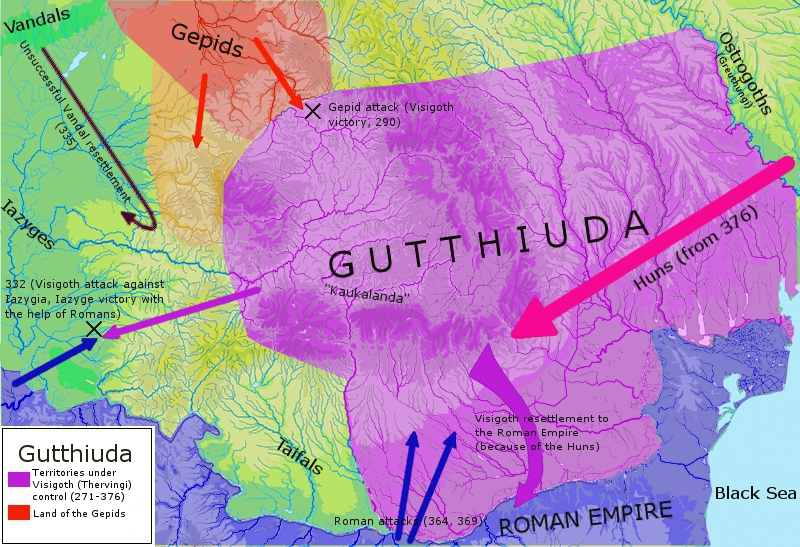
Taifals in Oltenia and the political landscape in the 4th-century Balkans

One of the earliest mentions of the Taifals puts them in the following of the Gothic king Cniva when he campaigned in Dacia and Moesia in 250 and the years following. They are sometimes classified as a Germanic tribe closely related to the Goths, although some believe they were related to the (non-Germanic) Sarmatians with whom they might have emigrated from the Pontic–Caspian steppe.

In the late third century they settled on the Danube on both sides of the Carpathians, dividing the territory with the Goths, who maintained political authority over all of it. In Spring 291 they formed a special alliance with the Gothic Thervingi, forming a tribal confederation from this date until 376, and fought the Vandals and Gepids: Tervingi, pars alia Gothorum, adiuncta manu Taifalorum, adversum Vandalos Gipedesque concurrunt. Along with the Victufali, the Taifals and Thervingi were the tribes mentioned as having possessed the former Roman province of Dacia by 350 "at the very latest". Archaeological evidence suggests that the Gepids were contesting Transylvania, the region around the Someș River, with the Thervingi and Taifals. The Taifals were subsequently made foederati of the Romans, from whom they obtained the right to settle in Oltenia. They were at that time independent of the Goths.

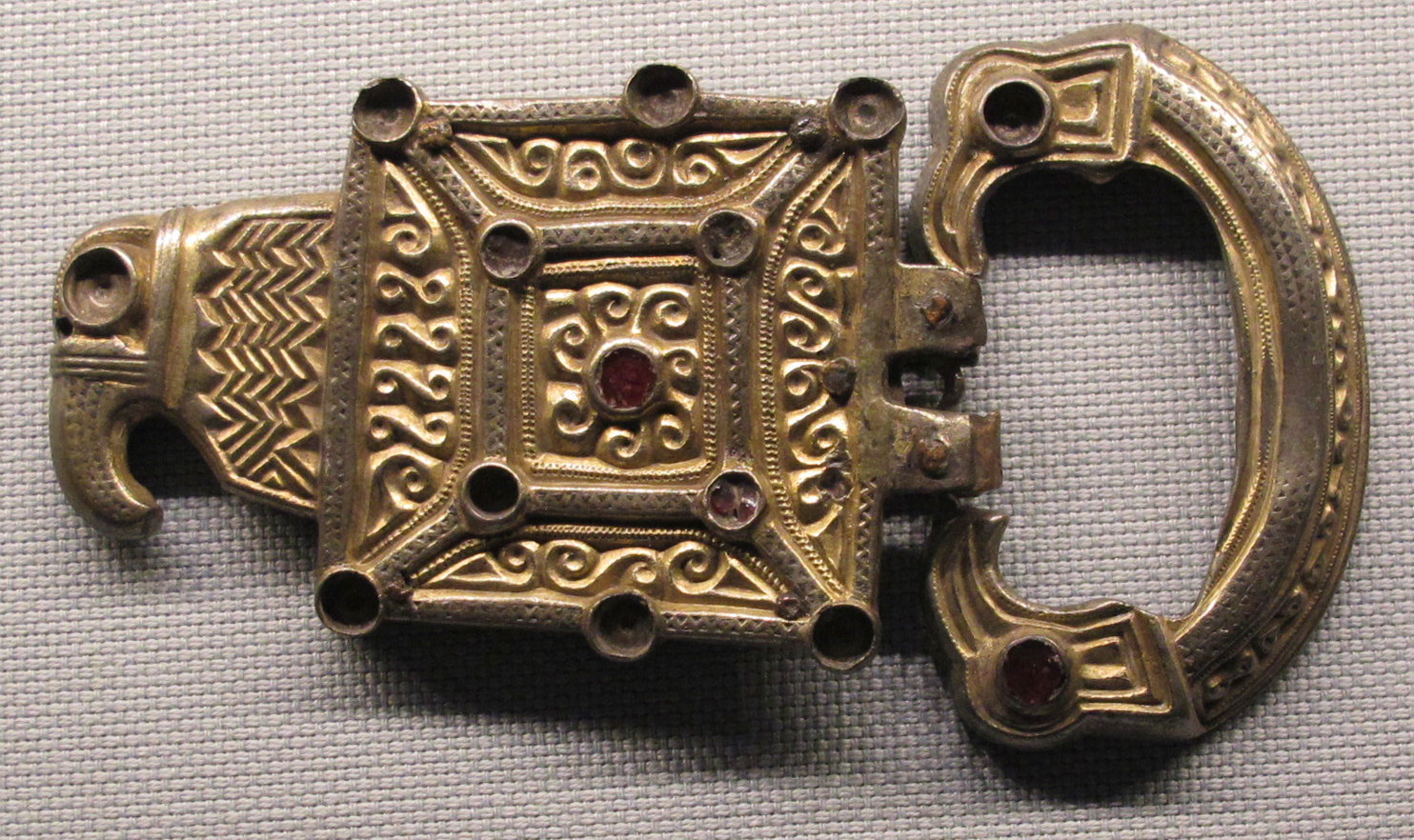
Buckle from the first hoard of Coșoveni, 5th century, possibly of Taifal origin, from Coșoveni, Oltenia, Romania

In 328 Constantine the Great conquered Oltenia and the Taifals, probably taking this opportunity to resettle a large number in Phrygia, in the diocese of Nicholas of Myra. In 332 he sent his son Constantine II to attack the Thervingi, who were routed. According to Zosimus (ii.31.3), a 500-man Taifal cavalry regiment engaged the Romans in a "running fight", and there is no evidence that this campaign was a failure. Nonetheless, the Taifals largely fell into the hands of the Romans at this time.

Around 336 they revolted against Constantine and were put down by the generals Herpylion, Virius Nepotianus, and Ursus. By 358 the Taifals were independent foederati of Rome and Oltenia lay outside Roman control. They launched campaigns as allies of the Romans from their own Oltenic bases, against the Limigantes (358 and 359) and the Sarmatians (358). However, campaigns against the Thervingi by the emperor Valens in 367 and 368 were inhibited by the independence of Oltenia. It is possible, however, that the Taifals at this time were still fighting alongside the Goths. In 365 the emperor ordered the construction of defensive towers in Dacia Ripensis, but whether this was Oltenia is unclear. Archaeological evidence evidences no sedes Taifalorum (Taifal settlements) east of the Olt River.

== Crossing the Danube ==
With the Iazyges and the Carpi, the Taifals were harassing the Roman province of Dacia in the mid fourth century. However, the arrival of a new threat—Huns—from Central Asia changed the political layout of Dacia: "the Huns threw themselves upon the Alans, the Alans upon the Goths, and the Goths upon the Taifali and Sarmatae." Athanaric had refused to extend his defensive preparations to the Taifalian territory and the Huns forced the Taifals to abandon Oltenia and western Muntenia by 370. The Taifals allied with the Greuthungi of Farnobius against Rome; they crossed the Danube in 377, but were defeated in late autumn that year. The Taifals were prominent among the survivors of Farnobius' coalition. After the Gothic victory at Adrianople (378) under Fritigern, the Thervingian king Athanaric began to assail the Taifals. Athanaric had not included the Taifals in his defensive construction efforts against the Huns earlier (376). The breaking of the alliance between Thervingia and Taifal may have had something to do with disagreements over tactics in light of the Huns and the crossing of the Danube, the Taifals being horsemen and the Thervingi infantry.

Sometime before their conversion to Christianity, Ammianus Marcellinus wrote:

It is said that this nation of the Taifali was so profligate, and so immersed in the foulest obscenities of life, that they indulged in all kinds of unnatural lusts, exhausting the vigour both of youth and manhood in the most polluted defilements of debauchery. But if any adult caught a boar or slew a bear single-handed, he was then exempted from all compulsion of submitting to such ignominious pollution.

The Taifals were probably never Arians. Their conversion to the Orthodox Catholic faith probably occurred through Roman evangelism in the mid fifth century.

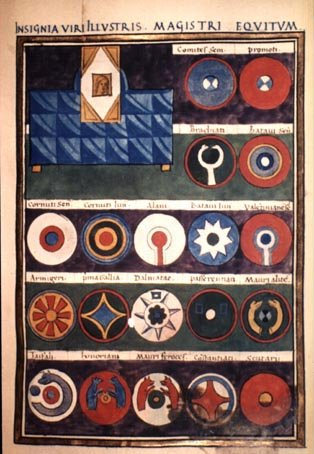
A page of the Insignia viri illustris magistri Equitum from manuscript Canon. Misc. 378 of Notitia Dignitatum, since 1817 in the Bodleian Library

== Coloni and laeti of the Empire ==
Subsequent to their defeat and falling out with Athanaric, the Taifals were officially resettled as coloni to farm lands in northern Italy (Modena, Parma, Reggio Emilia) and Aquitaine by the victorious general Frigeridus. Abandoned Oltenia was settled by the Huns c. 400. Some Taifals allied with the Huns as early as 378, and some were later still allied with them at the Battle of Châlons (451). However, the victory of Adrianople in 378 meant that those Taifals who remained with the Visigoths fought against their cousins at Châlons. In 412, the Taifals entered Aquitaine in the train of the Visigoths.

The Taifals were often teamed with the Sarmatians and the Citrati iuniores by the Romans and subsequently by Clovis I. According to the Notitia Dignitatum of the early fifth century, there was a unit called the Equites Taifali established by Honorius under the comes Britanniarum in Britannia. Possibly this unit may have been sent to the island by Stilicho in 399, and they may have been the same unit as the Equites Honoriani seniores mentioned around the same time. Thus, the Equites Honoriani Taifali seniores served in Britain while the Equites Honoriani Taifali iuniores served in Gaul under the magister Equitum. The Taifali iuniores used the dragon-and-pearl device on their shields. The Equites Taifali seniores had mirrored bears holding the shield boss, as illustrated in the Notitia Dignitatum. The Notitia also lists a unit called the Comites Taifali in the Eastern Empire, which was probably formed in the reign of Theodosius I.

Some Taifals were settled in Phrygia in the late fourth century. Arethas of Caesarea, writing in the tenth century, mentions them alongside the Gothograeci, leading Gustav Anrich to suggest that these Phrygian Taifals were the ancestors of the Gothograeci of the 7th–10th centuries.

The village of Tealby (originally Tavelesbi, Tauelesbi or Teflesbi) in the former kingdom of Lindsey may preserve the name of some Taifali who remained in Britain after the Roman withdrawal in 410. If so, it suggests the unattested Old English tribal name *Tāflas or *Tǣflas.

== Presence in Merovingian Gaul ==
Also according to the Notitia, there was a praefectus Sarmatarum et Taifalorum gentilium, Pictavis in Galia, that is, a Sarmatian and Taifal prefect in Poitiers in Gaul. The region of Poitou was even called Thifalia, Theiphalia or Theofalgicus pagus (all meaning "Taifal country") in the sixth century. The Taifals were instrumental in defeating the Visigothic cavalry hand to hand at the Battle of Vouillé in 507.

Under the Merovingians, Theiphalia had its own dux (duke). It is possible that the Taifal laeti who had served the Romans also served as garrisons for the Franks, but this is not referred to in primary records. The laeti were formally integrated into the Merovingian military establishment under Childebert I. Gregory of Tours, the principal source for the Taifals in the sixth century, says that a certain Frankish dux named Austrapius "oppressed" the Taifals (probably in the vicinity of Tiffauges); they revolted and killed him. The last mention of the Taifals as a distinct gens dates from year 565, but their Oltenic remnants almost certainly took part in the Lombard migration and invasion of Italy in 568.

The most famous Taifal was Saint Senoch, who founded an abbey at the Roman ruins which are now called Saint-Senoch. The Taifal influence extended into the ninth century and their fortresses, like Tiffauges and Lusignan, continued in use under the Carolingians. It has even been suggested that the Asiatic Taifals and Sarmatians influenced the Germanic arts. They also left their mark in the municipal nomenclature of the region: asides from Tiffauges, mentioned above, Taphaleschat in Corrèze, Touffailles and Touffaillou in Aquitaine, and Chauffailles (formerly Taïfailia) in Burgundy owe their names to Taifal settlement. Perhaps the town of Tafalla in the Navarre owes its name to these people, but if so, it is unknown if the Taifals were established in Hispania (probably to subdue the Basques) by the Romans before 412 or by the Visigoths after that. The town of Taivola in northern Italy was also a Taifal settlement.

== Sources ==
- Bachrach, Bernard S. "Procopius, Agathias and the Frankish Military." Speculum, Vol. 45, No. 3. (Jul., 1970), pp 435–441.
- Bachrach, Bernard S. Merovingian Military Organization, 481–751. Minneapolis: University of Minnesota Press, 1971.
- Bachrach, Bernard S. "Military Organization in Aquitaine under the Early Carolingians." Speculum, Vol. 49, No. 1. (Jan., 1974), pp 1–33.
- Barnes, T. D. "Another Forty Missing Persons (A. D. 260–395)." Phoenix, Vol. 28, No. 2. (Summer, 1974), pp 224–233.
- Barnes, T. D. "Constans and Gratian in Rome." Harvard Studies in Classical Philology, Vol. 79. (1975), pp 325–333.
- Green, Thomas. "Tealby, the Taifali, and the End of Roman Lincolnshire". Lincolnshire History and Archaeology, Vol. 46 (2011), pp 5–10.
- Greenberg, David. The Construction of Homosexuality. 1988.
- Gregory of Tours. The History of the Franks. 2 vol. O. M. Dalton, trans. Oxford: Clarendon Press, 1967.
- Haldon, John F. (1984). Byzantine Praetorians: An Administrative, Institutional and Social Survey of the Opsikion and Tagmata, c. 580–900. Bonn: Dr. Rudolf Habelt GmbH.
- Heather, Peter. "The Huns and the End of the Roman Empire in Western Europe." The English Historical Review, Vol. 110, No. 435. (Feb., 1995), pp 4–41. (See map for Taifal migration route in Balkans, p. 8.)
- Lenski, Noel. "Initium mali Romano imperio: Contemporary Reactions to the Battle of Adrianople (in History and Ideology)." Transactions of the American Philological Association, Vol. 127. (1997), pp 129–168.
- Maenchen-Helfen, J. Otto; Knight, Max (ed). The World of the Huns: Studies in their History and Culture. Berkeley: University of California Press, 1973. ISBN 0-520-01596-7.
- Musset, Lucien. The Germanic Invasions: The Making of Europe AD 400–600. Edward and Columba James, trans. London: Paul Elek, 1975. ISBN 0-236-17620-X. Originally published as Les Invasions: Les Vagues Germaniques. Paris: Presses Universitaires de France, 1965.
- Nickel, Helmut. "The Dragon and the Pearl." Metropolitan Museum Journal, Vol. 26. (1991), pp 139–146.
- Nischer, E. C. "The Army Reforms of Diocletian and Constantine and Their Modifications up to the Time of the Notitia Dignitatum." The Journal of Roman Studies, Vol. 13. (1923), pp 1–55.
- Thompson, E. A. The Visigoths in the Time of Ulfila. Oxford: Oxford University Press, 1966.
- Wolfram, Herwig. History of the Goths. Thomas J. Dunlap, trans. Berkeley: University of California Press, 1988.
