= Spondolici =

The Spondolici or Spondolicos were a tribe in Sarmatia Asiatica, that inhabited an area through which the Don river (ancient Tanais) crossed. They were mentioned by Pliny the Elder (23–79).

== See also ==
- Spali
- Spondophoroi
