= Agaragantes =

Sarmatian tribe

The Argaragantes were a Sarmatian tribe that lived by the Tisza river, in Banat, in the 4th century.

== Etymology ==
The only source in which the name of the ruling class of the Sarmatians is preserved in its original form is the Chronicle of Jerome.

According to Wilhelm Tomaschek, it is of Iranian origin and means "those who wage war." According to George Vernadsky, it is a compound, the first component of which (arcarag) "must, in any case, be explained by the Ossetian language" because in Ossetian äqäräg means inaudible, quiet, depressed, dumb, while the second (ante) is identical to Jordanes's and Procopius's form of the name, i.e. Anta. According to this interpretation, the Agaragantes would be "mute Antes". George Vernadsky (1887-1973) finds an explanation of this name in the story of Ammianus Marcellinus. After being defeated by the Romans, the Sarmatians sought their protection.

Having in mind the past event, they were afraid of what was to come. Therefore, with the intention of humbly seeking peace, they came before the emperor, having confidence in him, because in such and similar cases he was milder than usual. On the day set for determining the conditions, Zizais, then still a prince, a young man of high stature, lined up the Sarmatians in fighting order, but not to fight but to pray for peace. Seeing the emperor, he threw down his weapon and lay on his chest. He lay as if dead. Dumbfounded by fear [amisso vocis officio prae timore] just when he was supposed to speak, he rather aroused pity in those present. He tried several times to explain what he was looking for, but he could barely, because every time he wanted to speak, he was interrupted by sobs. When he finally regained his composure, he was told to get up. Leaning on his knees and restraining his tongue, he asked for his crimes to be forgiven and to be pardoned. Until then, a crowd of his compatriots who were allowed to make their pleas out of fear kept their mouths shut [cuius ora formido muta claudebat], because it was not yet certain what answer their superiors would get. When this was told to rise from the ground and when he gave these the long-awaited signal to speak, throwing shields and weapons, they surrendered to prayer in such a way that they humbly surpassed the prince himself. (Ammianus Marcellinus, Res Gestae, XVII, 12, 9-10.)

Vernadsky reminds us that there is a curse in the Ossetian language that corresponds to this story: "a voice betrayed you" (äqäräg fäu).

== Prevalence ==
In Ptolemy, the interfluve of the Danube and the Tisza is marked as the area of Jaziga where the Iazyges live. This information led some scientists (Hugo Schuchardt (1842-1927), Johannes Schmidt and Alfred von Domaszewski) to the conclusion that Limigantes and Agaragantes lived right there. Heinrich Kipper also attributed "a large part of the area east of the Tisza" to them "because of the identity of the soil", but later he adhered (like Richard Kipper) to Ptolemy's data. According to Pač, the assumption that the Iaziges, at least later, after their strengthening in the new habitat, spread beyond Međurečje, ie to the east (since the west and south were in Roman hands until later) is not only indicated by the identity of both sides of the Tisza, but also to a large extent the number of Iaziges. This is evidenced by the data from the time of the conflict between Agaragantes and Limiganates. More than 300,000 Agaragantes fled to Roman soil. The number of those who fled to Victohali was not insignificant either since they later helped the Romans in the fight against the Limigantes under the new king. Both groups were numerically inferior to the Limigantes. In addition, it should be added those Iaziges, who were not affected by the revolution, and who, since they practiced human hunting, also had slaves at their disposal and were so powerful that, like the liberated Limigantes, they continued to ravage the Roman provinces despite losses. However, one should not believe everything that is written in the sources, nor make excessive conclusions. The incursions of nomadic peoples were usually reduced to rapid, sudden raids by smaller detachments, and the number of 300,000 Agragantes was probably exaggerated. In any case, the question arises as to whether the lowlands between the Danube and the Tisza could then provide sufficient means of subsistence for so many people with freedom of movement, all the more so as they also nurtured horse breeding. The cause of Jaziga's increasing incursions into the Roman provinces of Pannonia and Moesia was probably not only a propensity for war and plunder (and later German pressure) but also partly limited living space and overcrowding.

== History ==
They were probable descendants of the Roxolani, who had migrated from Dacia to Banat. In 331, the Thervingi pushed west and south-west into the territory of the Arcaragantes. In 332, the Sarmatians in Banat asked Constantine the Great for aid against the Thervingi. These Sarmatians had armed their "slaves" in order to cope with the situation; according to contemporary sources there was two categories of Sarmatians: the "masters" – the Agaragantes, and the "slaves" – Limigantes. In 334, there was an internal conflict between the Arcaragantes and the Limigantes. The Limagantes had after the conflict with the Goths, turned and expelled the Arcaragantes who then settled in the area of the Victohali, and became their vassals.

And these native chiefs, losing all their wisdom in their fear, fled to the Victohali, whose settlements were at a great distance, thinking it better in the choice of evils to become subject to their protectors than slaves to their own slaves.

== Annotations ==
1. Spellings include: "Argaragantes", "Argaracantes", "Ardaragantes", "Arcaragantes", and "Acaragantes".
