= Abianus =

River in Scythia mentioned by ancient authors

The Abianus (Ancient Greek: Ἀβιανός) was a river of Scythia (Sarmatia) falling into the Euxine, mentioned only in the work of Alexander Polyhistor, On the Euxine Sea, mentioned by Stephanus of Byzantium as giving name to the Abii, who dwelt on its banks. Stephanus elsewhere quotes Alexander as saying that the district of Hylea on the Euxine was called Ἀβική, which he interprets by Ὑλαία, woody.
