= Tapurei =

Ancient Scythian tribe

Tapurei (Greek: Ταπούρεοι) were a tribe in Scythia intra Imaum mentioned by Ptolemy.

Ptolemy refers to two different tribe with similar names. The first tribe, called Tapuri, lived in the land of the Medes south of the Caspian Sea. The second tribe, called the Tapurei, lived in the land of the Scythians. According to the Encyclopaedia Iranica, the origin of the Tapurei reached the mountains of the land of Hyrcania.
