= Tapuri =

Ancient Iranian people

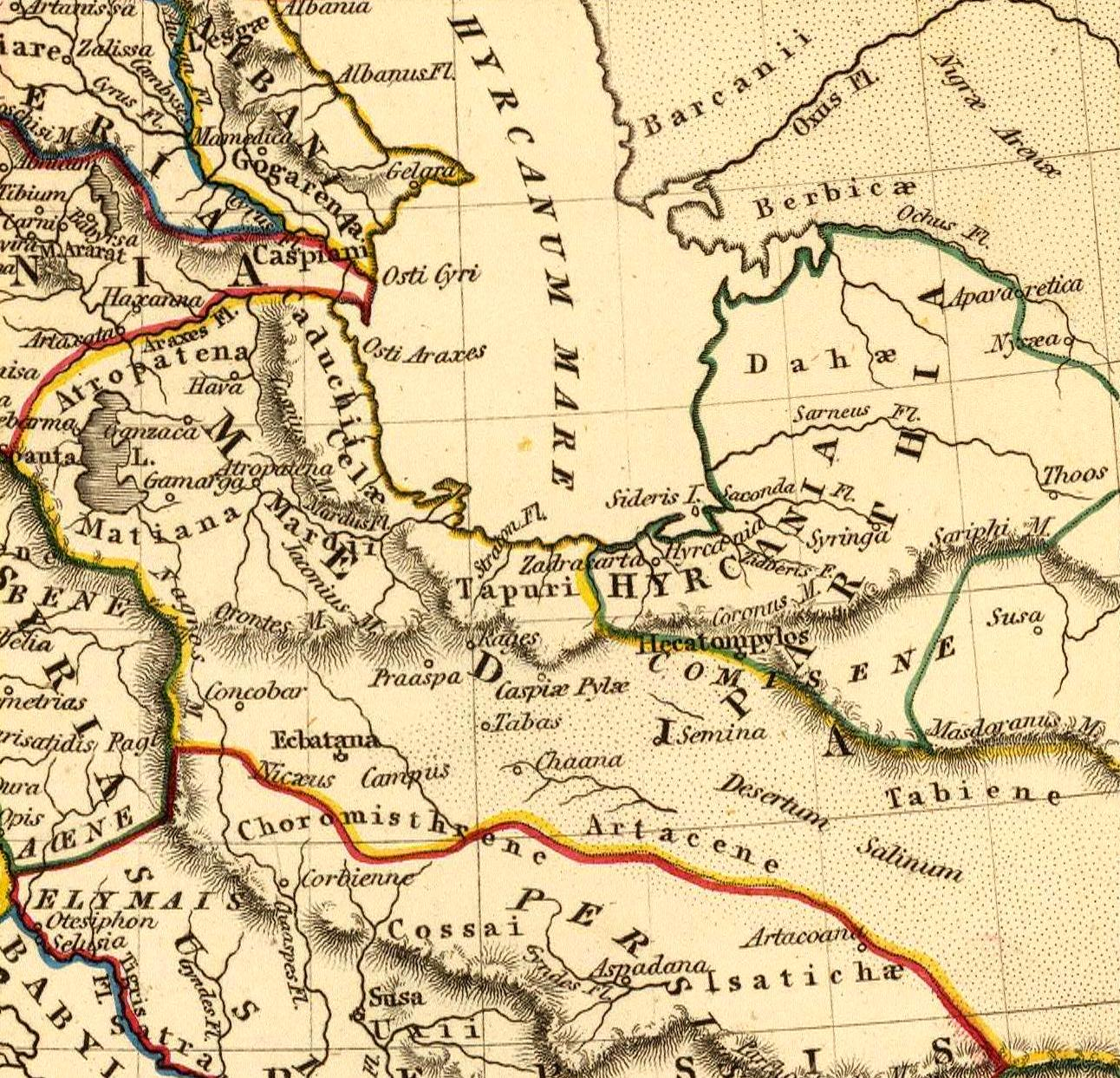
Location of Tapuri, between Amardus and Hyrcania

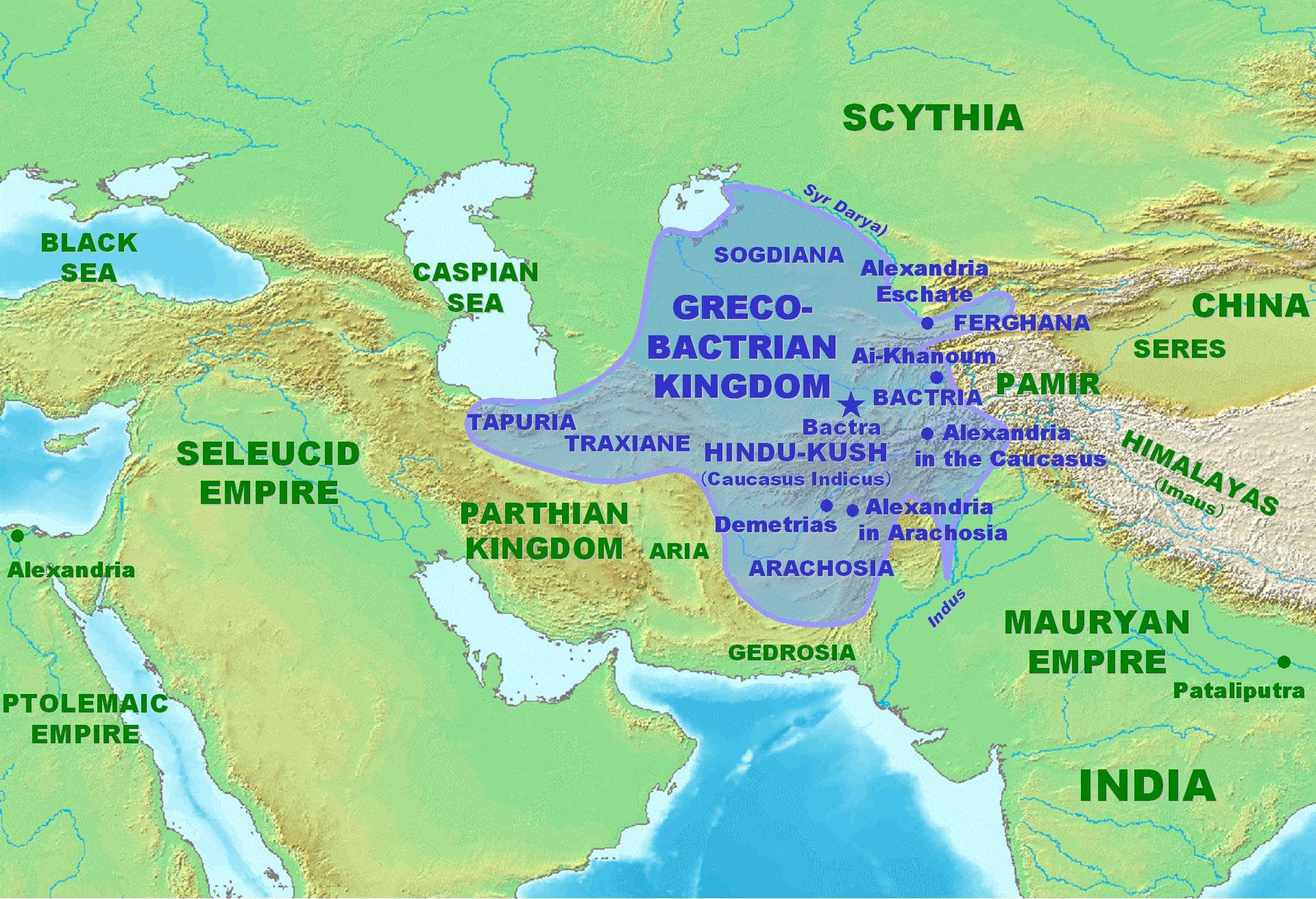
Map of Greco-Bactrian Kingdom with Tapuria clearly lying on the south shores of the Caspian Sea

Tapuri or Tapyri (Ancient Greek: Τάπουροι or Τάπυροι or Τάπυρροι) were a tribe in the Medes south of the Caspian Sea mentioned by Ptolemy and Arrian. Ctesias refers to the land of Tapuri between the two lands of Cadusii and Hyrcania.

== History ==
The name and probable habitations of the Tapuri appear, at different periods of history, to have been extended along a wide space of country from Armenia to the eastern side of the Oxus. Strabo places them alongside the Caspian Gates and Rhagae, in Parthia or between the Derbices and Hyrcani or in company with the Amardi and other peoplse along the southern shores of the Caspian; in which last view Curtius, Dionysius, and Pliny the Elder may be considered to coincide. Ptolemy in one place reckons them among the tribes of Media, and in another ascribes them to Margiana. Their name is written with some differences in different authors; thus Τάπουροι and Τάπυροι occur in Strabo; Tapuri in Pliny and Curtius; Τάπυρροι in Steph. B. sub voce There can be no doubt that the present district of Tabaristan derives its name from them. Aelian gives a peculiar description of the Tapuri who dwelt in Media.

Ptolemy refers to two different tribe with similar names. The first tribe, called Tapuri, lived in the Medes south of the Caspian Sea. The second tribe, called the Tapurei, lived in the land of the Scythians. According to the Encyclopaedia Iranica, the origin of the Tapurei reached the mountains of the land of Hyrcania.

Some of the Tapur migrated from Parthyene to central parts of southern territories of Caspian Sea during kingdom of Phraates I when Parthian Empire became strong during Phraates I, he attacked to Amard (another Scythian tribe) and defeated them. Then he forced them to leave southern fringes of Caspian Sea and replaced them with Tapur people. After this event, ancient Tapuria was established. These Tapuri clan furnished 1,000 cavalry for the battle of Gaugamela as Achaemenid Empire Army.

According to Arrian, a group of Tapurs lived among the Hyrcanians and Amards during the Achaemenid and Alexander periods. Alexander obeyed the Tapurs and went to battle with Amard and defeated them. Alexander then annexed the land of Amard to the land of Tapur. Satrap Tapur was under Autophradates's rule.
