= Dropici =

The Dropici were a nomadic people who lived in Iran according to Herodotus.
