= Saint-Senoch =

- Commune
- Coat of arms
- Location of Saint-Senoch
- Location within France Location within Centre-Val de Loire
- Coordinates: 47°02′52″N 0°58′12″E
- Country: France
- Region: Centre-Val de Loire
- Department: Indre-et-Loire
- Arrondissement: Loches
- Canton: Loches
- Intercommunality: CC Loches Sud Touraine

Government
  - Mayor (2020–2026): Pascal Réau
- Area^{1}: 24.08 km^{2} (9.30 sq mi)
- Highest elevation: 149 m (489 ft)
- Lowest elevation: 98 m (322 ft)
- Population (2023): 514
  - Density: 21.3/km^{2} (55.3/sq mi)
- Time zone: UTC+01:00 (CET)
  - Summer (DST): UTC+02:00 (CEST)
- INSEE/Postal code: 37238 /37600
- ^{1} French Land Register data, which excludes lakes, ponds, glaciers > 1 km^{2} (0.386 sq mi or 247 acres) and river estuaries.

Saint-Senoch (French pronunciation: [sɛ̃ sənɔk]) is a commune in the Indre-et-Loire department in central France.

== History ==
Its name refers to Saint Senoch, a sixth-century hermit and abbot.

== Population ==
Historical population
Year	Pop.	±% p.a.
1968	494	—
1975	401	−2.94%
1982	382	−0.69%
1990	419	+1.16%
1999	420	+0.03%
2007	446	+0.75%
2012	513	+2.84%
2017	570	+2.13%
2023	514	−1.71%
Source: INSEE

== See also ==
- Communes of the Indre-et-Loire department
