= Salatarae =

The Salatarae (Σαλατάραιv) were a Bactrian tribe who lived in the district of Paropamisis near the Hindu Kush ranges of northern Afghanistan during antiquity. They were active through Persian and Hellenistic times.

The Salatarae were mentioned by Ptolemy, who says only that they lived along the bank of the Oxus river and based on the context of the text they appear to have been nomadic. Sir William Smith felt the Salatarae may the same people as the Saraparae mentioned by Pliny, though this remains conjecture. Current assessment is that they were ethnically an Iranian tribe dwelling on the northern bank of the Oxus River, that Is outside Persian and Seleucid control. Their neighbors appear to have been the Zariaspa and Chomatri tribes.
