= Parsii (tribe) =

Bactrian tribe

The Parsii were a nomadic tribe, in the district of Paropamisadae in Bactria near the Hindu Kush ranges in northern Afghanistan during antiquity. They lived on the Oxus River, centered on the city of Parsiia.

== History ==
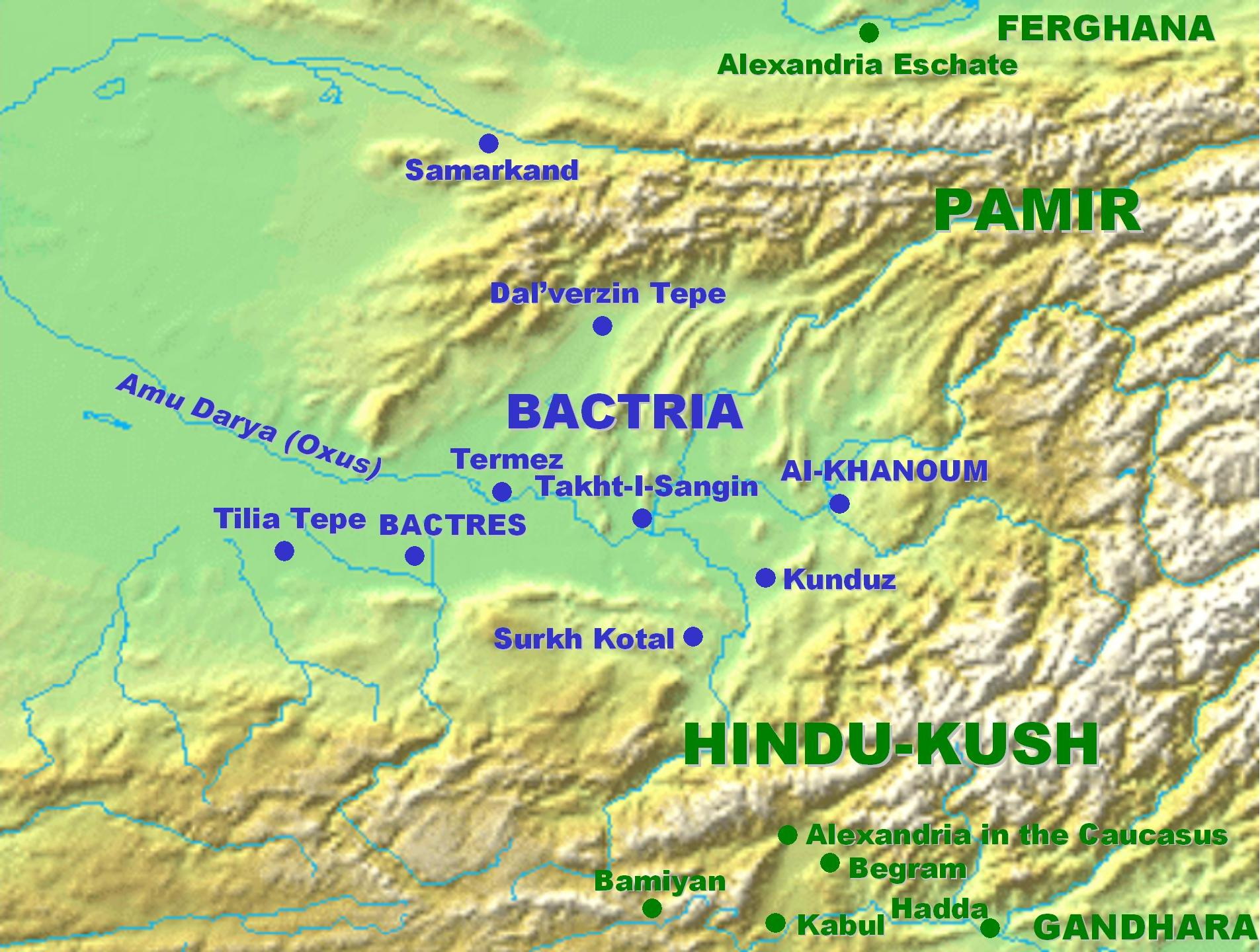
Ancient cities of Bactria during Hellenistic times.

During the Hellenistic and Persian Empires they lived in the satrapy of the Paropanisadai.

They are mentioned in Claudius Ptolemaeus and appear on map XI of that work, in the area north west of modern Kabul.

They came under the rule of Demetrius I of Bactria, who was ruling Greek Bactria from nearby Kupisa. until Eucratides I of the Indo-Greek Kingdom conquered the area.
