= House of Spandiyadh =

The House of Spandiyadh (also spelled Spendiad and Isfandiyar, Middle Persian: 𐭮𐭯𐭭𐭣𐭩𐭲 Spandyat "given by Spenta Armaiti") was one of the seven great houses of the Sasanian Empire. Like the House of Mihran, their seat laid at Ray, which made the German scholar Theodor Nöldeke suggest that they may have been the same family. Like most of the other seven great houses, the House of Spandiyadh was of Parthian origin. The family claimed descent from the legendary Kayanid figure Isfandiyar, who was the son of Vishtaspa, who according to Zoroastrian sources was one of Zoroaster's early followers.

== Sources ==
- Pourshariati, Parvaneh (2008), Decline and Fall of the Sasanian Empire: The Sasanian-Parthian Confederacy and the Arab Conquest of Iran, London and New York: I.B. Tauris, ISBN 978-1-84511-645-3
- Yarshater, Ehsan (1998). "ESFANDĪĀR (2)". Encyclopaedia Iranica, Vol. VIII, Fasc. 6. pp. 592–593.
- Shapur Shabazi, A. (2002). "GOŠTĀSP". Encyclopaedia Iranica, Vol. XI, Fasc. 2. pp. 171–176.
