= Tiffauges =

- Commune
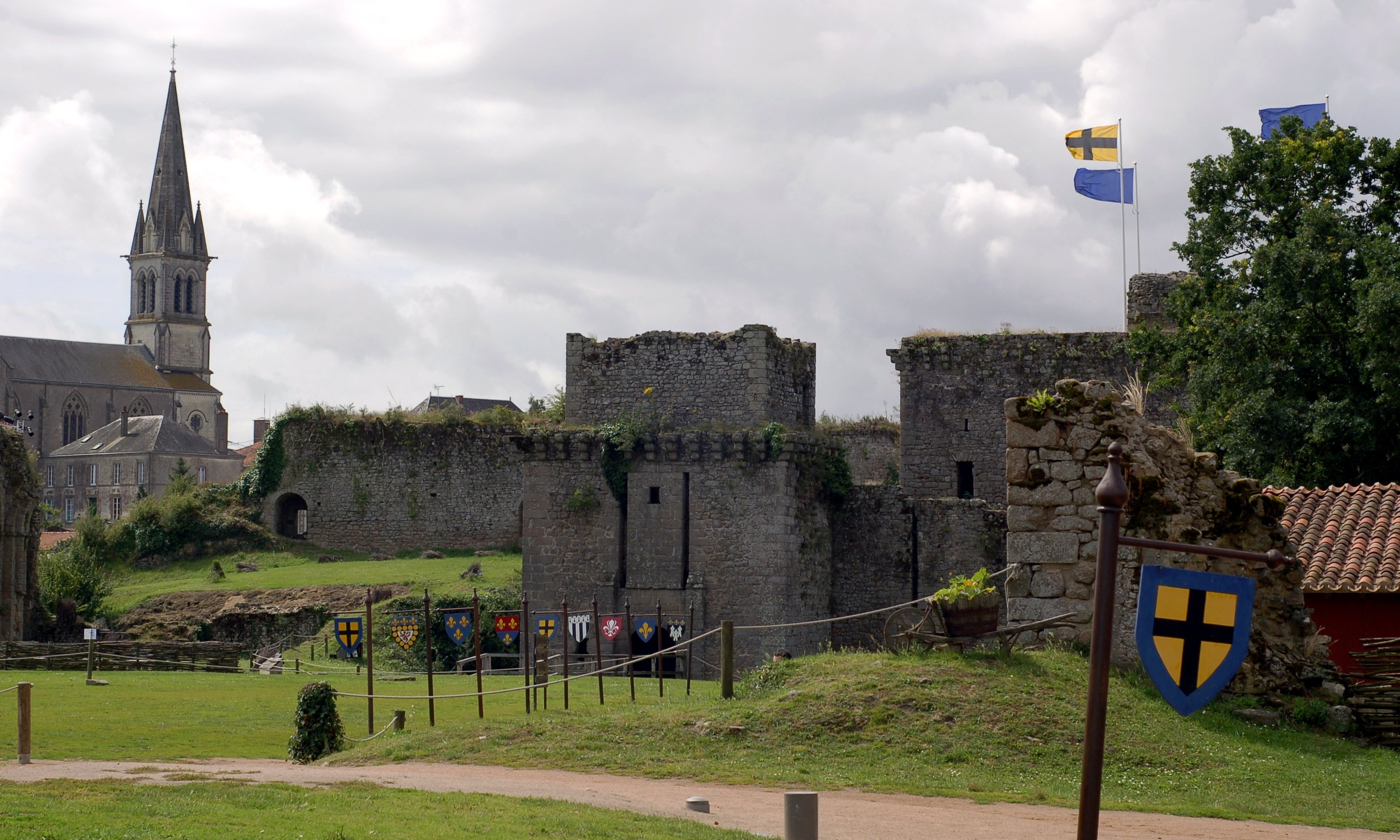
- Church and chateau of Tiffauges

- Coat of arms
- Location of Tiffauges
- Location within France Location within Pays de la Loire
- Coordinates: 47°00′52″N 1°06′36″W
- Country: France
- Region: Pays de la Loire
- Department: Vendée
- Arrondissement: La Roche-sur-Yon
- Canton: Mortagne-sur-Sèvre
- Intercommunality: CC du Pays de Mortagne

Government
  - Mayor (2020–2026): Marcel Brosset
- Area^{1}: 9.92 km^{2} (3.83 sq mi)
- Highest elevation: 113 m (371 ft)
- Lowest elevation: 42 m (138 ft)
- Population (2023): 1,544
  - Density: 156/km^{2} (403/sq mi)
- Time zone: UTC+01:00 (CET)
  - Summer (DST): UTC+02:00 (CEST)
- INSEE/Postal code: 85293 /85130
- ^{1} French Land Register data, which excludes lakes, ponds, glaciers > 1 km^{2} (0.386 sq mi or 247 acres) and river estuaries.

Tiffauges (French pronunciation: [tifoʒ]) is a commune in the Vendée department in the Pays de la Loire region in western France.

== History ==
Gilles de Rais owned the local fortress.

It is the location of a battle between the French Republican troops and the royalists during the War in the Vendée during the French Revolution on 19 September 1793.

== Geography ==
The municipal territory of Tiffauges covers 980 hectares. The average altitude of the municipality is 89 meters, with levels fluctuating between 42 and 113 meters. Tiffauges is geographically located in the north-east of the Vendée, bordering the department of Maine-et-Loire, it is cut by the departmental road D 753 which goes from Cholet to Saint-Jean-de-Monts. Tiffauges is located 18 km from Herbiers, 16 km from Montaigu, and 20 km from Cholet. Tiffauges is located at the confluence of the rivers Sèvre Nantaise and Crûme.

== Toponymy ==
The region is mentioned as teofalgicus pagus in 848, the city castella theophalgica around 1050. Tiffauges owes its name to the Taïfales (or Teiphales), a people - " barbarian " for the Romans - incorporated in the defense of the Roman Empire that would be established in the fifth century. The Taïfales arrived in Gaul in 412 with the Visigoths.

== See also ==
- Communes of the Vendée department
