= Iyrcae =

The Iyrcae (Ancient Greek: Ἱύρκαι) or Turcae were an ancient nation on the north-east trade route described by Herodotus beyond the Thyssagetae.

They were distinguished by their mode of hunting, climbing a tree to survey their game, and then pursuing it with trained horses and dogs. The reading Τυρκαι (Turcae) may be an anachronism, and when Pliny the Elder and Pomponius Mela speak of "Tyrcae" it is possibly due to a false correction.

Ellis Hovell Minns viewed them as "almost certainly the ancestors of the modern Magyars" and located them "somewhere about the upper basins of the Tobol and the Irtysh". Later researchers (such as Boris Rybakov) identified the Iyrcae with the Dyakovo culture of Central Russia.
