= Međurečje (Ivanjica) =

Međurečje Међуречје
- Village
- Location within Serbia
- Coordinates: 43°31′N 20°13′E
- Country: Serbia
- District: Moravica District
- Municipality: Ivanjica

Area
  - Total: 0.67 km^{2} (0.26 sq mi)

Population (2011)
  - Total: 144
  - Density: 210/km^{2} (560/sq mi)
- Time zone: UTC+1 (CET)
  - Summer (DST): UTC+2 (CEST)

Međurečje is a village in the municipality of Ivanjica, Serbia. According to the 2011 census, the village has a population of 144 inhabitants.

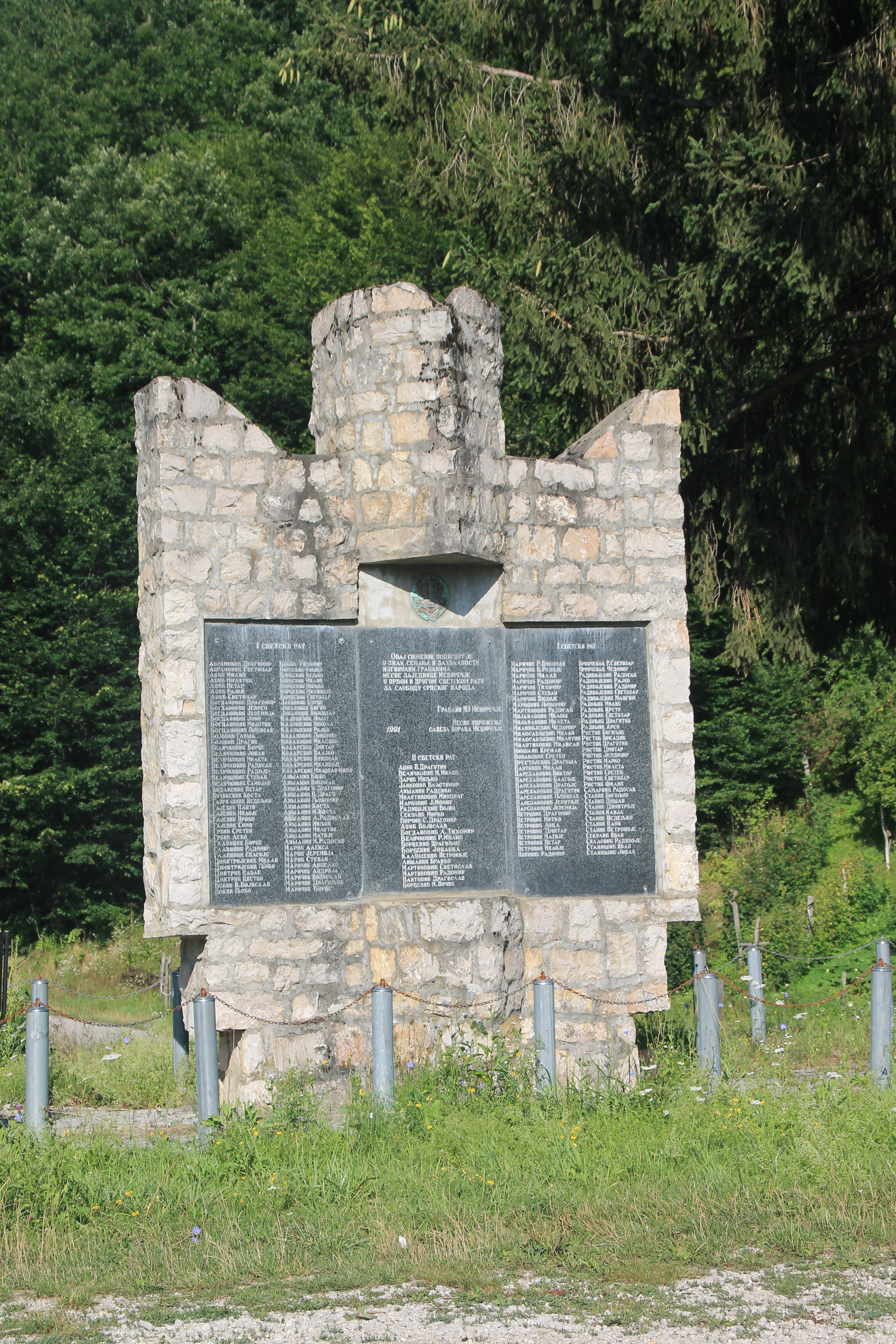
