= Abii =

Possible ancient ethnic group

The Abii (Ancient Greek: Ἄβιοι) were possibly an ancient people described by several ancient authors. They were placed by Ptolemy in the extreme north of Scythia extra Imaum, near the Hippophagi ("horse eaters"); but there are very different opinions about whether they existed. Strabo discourses on the various opinions respecting the Abii up to his time.

In the Iliad, Homer represents Zeus, on the summit of Mount Ida, as turning away his eyes from the battle before the Greek camp, and looking down upon the land of the Thracians: Μυσῶν τ᾽ ἀγχεμάχων, καὶ ἀγαυῶν ἱππημολγῶν, γλακτοφάγων, ἀβίων τέ δικαιοτάτων ἀνθρώπων ("the Abii, most decent men alive"). Ancient and modern commentators have doubted greatly which of these words to take as proper names, except the first two, which nearly all agree to refer to the Mysians of Thrace. The fact would seem to be that the poet had heard accounts of the great nomadic peoples who inhabited the steppes northwest and north of the Euxine (the Black Sea), whose whole wealth lay in their herds, especially of horses, on the milk of which they lived, and who were supposed to preserve the innocence of a state of nature; and of them, therefore, he speaks collectively by epithets suited to such descriptions, and, among the rest, as ἄβιοι, poor, with scanty means of life (from ἀ- and Βίος). The people thus described answer to the later notions respecting the Hyperboreans, whose name does not occur in Homer. Afterwards, the epithets applied by Homer to this supposed primitive people were taken as proper names, and were assigned to different tribes of the Scythians, so that we have mention of the Scythae Agavi, Hippemolgi, Galactophagi (and Galactopotae) and Abii. The last are mentioned as a distinct people by Aeschylus, who prefixes a guttural to the name, and describes the Gabii as the most just and hospitable of men, living on the self-sown fruits of the untilled earth; but we have no indication of where he placed them. Of those commentators, who take the word in Homer for a proper name, some place them in Thrace, some in Scythia, and some near the (also fabulous) Amazons, who in vain urged them to take part in an expedition against Asia.

Classicist and linguist Steve Reece has proposed an interesting association between Homer's Abii and Aeschylus' Gabii. He proposes that at Iliad 13.6 Homer dropped the gamma from Γάβιοι, the name of the tribe known to Aeschylus, frag. 196, from a source other than Homer in its correct and original form. That is to say, Homer understood an earlier name Γάβιοι as γ' Ἄβιοι through metanalysis, or reshaping, of the words. Homer's motivation may be due to his penchant for finding etymological significance in proper names: i.e., he derived Ἄβιοι from alpha-privative plus βία ("without violence"), a suitable name for those he calls in the same passage "the justest of men." If this is correct, the name Abii was derived exclusively from Homer.

Like the correspondent fabulous people, the Hyperborei, the locations of the Abii seem to have been moved back, as knowledge advanced, further and further into the unknown regions of the north. In the histories of Alexander's expedition we are told that ambassadors came to him at Maracanda (Samarkand) from the Abii Scythae, a tribe who had been independent since the time of Cyrus, and were renowned for their just and peaceful character; but the specific name of the tribe of Scythians who sent this embassy is probably only an instance of the attempts made to illustrate the old mythical geography by Alexander's conquests. In these accounts their precise locality is not indicated: Ammianus Marcellinus places them north of Hyrcania. Stephanus of Byzantium places them on an otherwise unidentified eponymously-named river, the Abianus, that drains to the Euxine.
