= Komedes =

Ancient people in Central Asia

Komedes were an ancient people in Central Asia. They are mentioned by the ancient Greek geographer Ptolemy in Geography (c. 150 CE).

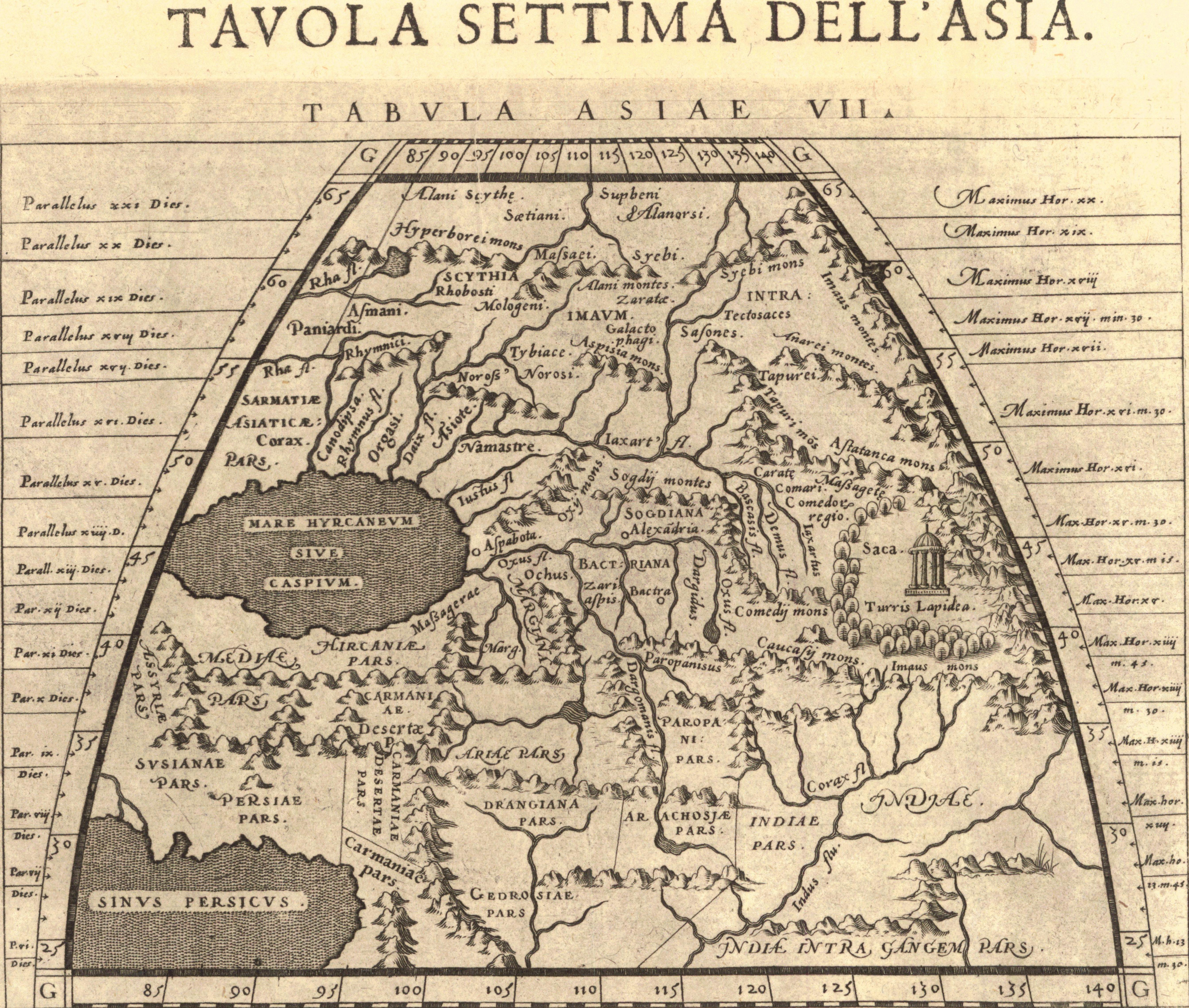
The "Seventh Asian Map", by Tomaso Porcacchi Castilione, from a 1620 Italian edition of Ptolemy's Geography.

== Overview ==
=== Greco-Roman sources ===
The Greek geographer Ptolemy uses the name Komdei for the region fed by the Jaxartes river (modern Syr Darya) and its tributaries. Ptolemy refers to the people of Komdei as Komedes who "inhabited the entire land of the Sacae."^{D} He also refers to a tribal people from the mountainous regions of Sogdiana as far as Jaxartes whom he variously calls Komoi/Kamoi, Komroi/Khomroi or Komedei. Ptolemy's references to the Komdei or Komedes region may allude to the Hindu toponyms Komdesh, Kamdesh, and Kambodesh (or Kamboi-desh). Ammianus Marcellinus also calls the Sogdian region Komadas. Julius Honorius’ Cosmographia mentions a people called Traumeda and a mountain called Caumedes as the source of the river Oxus (modern Amu Darya).

=== Hindu texts ===
Mahabharata indicates that the Kambojas (specifically the Parama Kambojas, along with the Lohas and Rishikas, lived in the southern parts of Shakdvipa. The Vayu Purana uses the name Kumuda-dvipa as an alternate for Kushadvipa, one of seven dvipa mentioned in Hindu topology. In the Śrīmad-Bhāgavatam (Bhāgavata Purāṇa), Kumuda is a puranic name of a mountain forming the northern buttress of Mount Meru, also known as Sumeru and possibly Pamirs. The Kumuda here extended between the headwaters of what are now the Amu Darya and Syr Darya rivers. It may have comprised Badakshan, the Alay Valley, Alay Mountains, Tienshan, Karotegin (Rasht Valley, in modern Tajikistan) and possibly extended as far north as the Zeravshan and Fergana valleys. On the east, it likely bordered modern Yarkand and/or Kashgar; to the west by Bactria; to the north-west by Sogdiana; to the north by Uttarakuru; to the south-east by Darada; and to the south by Gandhara.

=== Chinese sources ===
The Chinese equivalent to the name may have been Xiuxun. Xuanzang also mentioned the Kiumito and Kumito; Wu'k ong mentioned Kiumiche; and T'ang mentioned Kumi.

=== Islamic sources ===
In al-Mughni, al-Maqdisi calls the people inhabiting the Kumed or Kumadh the Kumiji, perhaps equivalent to the Sanskrit word Kamboji or Kambojas. In Iran, the Kambojas region may have been the equivalent to the Komedes.

== See also ==
- Indo-Scythians

== Notes ==
1.^D Robert Shafer reported that the Shakas, Kambojas, Pahlavas, and Sugudas were the left-over population of the Indo-Iranian Aryans after the latter had moved from their original home in Central Asia to Iran and India.
2.^E Shava, the root of the word shavati, was used by the Indo-Aryans.
