= Parama Kamboja kingdom =

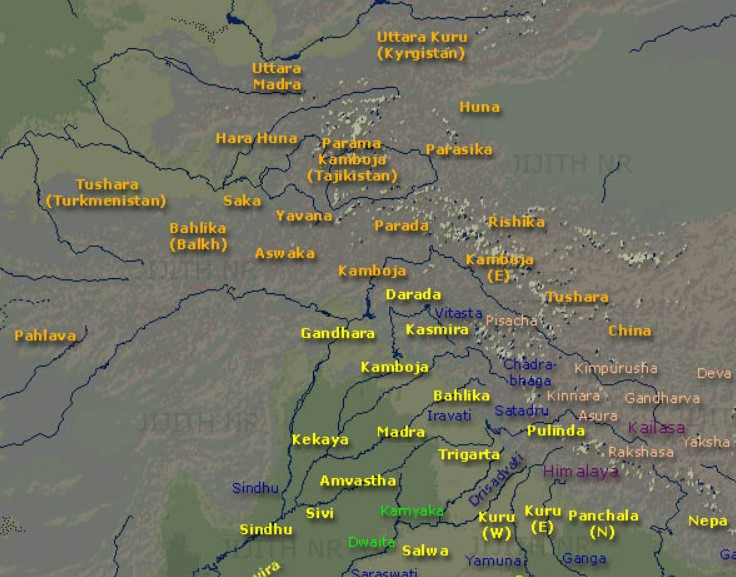

Parama Kamboja kingdom was mentioned in the epic Mahabharata to be on the far north west along with the Bahlika, Uttara Madra and Uttara Kuru countries. It was located in parts of modern-day Afghanistan, Tajikistan and Uzbekistan.

== Parama Kambojas in Kurukshetra War ==
Drona Parva of Mahabharata refers to 6000 soldiers from the Parama Kamboja (caste) group who had sided with the Pandavas against the Kauravas in the Kurukshetra war. They have been described as "very fortunate Kambojas" (prabhadrakastu Kambojah), extremely fierce, 'Personification of Death' (samanmrityo), fearful like Yama, the god of death and rich like Kuber i.e. god of treasure (Kambojah.... Yama. vaishravan.opamah: 7.23.42-44).

== See also ==
- Kingdoms of Ancient India
- Kambojas
- Cambodia

== Books/References ==
- Mahabharata of Krishna Dwaipayana Vyasa, translated to English by Kisari Mohan Ganguli
