= Limigantes =

Population living in Banat in the 4th century

The Limigantes is a name applied to a population that lived by the Tisza river, in Banat, in the 4th century. They are attested by Roman historian Ammianus Marcellinus (c. 390) in connection to Sarmatians.

Roman historian Ammianus Marcellinus (c. 390) described the Limigantes as Sarmatae servi ("Sarmatian slaves/serfs"), as opposed to the Arcaragantes, Sarmatae liberi ("free Sarmatians"). It is unclear whether the Limigantes were simply an under-class of ethnic Sarmatians or a non-Sarmatian subject people.

== History ==
=== 330s ===
In 332, the Sarmatians in Banat asked Constantine the Great for aid against the Thervingi. These Sarmatians had armed their "slaves" in order to cope with the situation; according to contemporary sources there were two categories of Sarmatians: the "masters" – the Agaragantes, and the "slaves" – Limigantes. In 334, there was an internal conflict between the Agaragantes and the Limigantes. The Limagantes had, after the conflict with the Goths, turned and expelled the Arcaragantes who then settled in the area of the Victohali, to the south of the Danube, and became their vassals.

=== Conflict with Rome ===
In AD 357, the Roman emperor Constantius II (ruled 337-361) faced a large force of Limigantes, who had successfully rebelled against their Iazyges overlords and then launched an invasion of Roman territory on the South bank of the Danube. The barbarians entered the empire near the confluence of the rivers Danube and Tisza, invading the province of Moesia Superior (roughly mod. Serbia). In a hard-fought battle, the Romans routed the Limigantes, slaughtering a large number. After this, the remaining Limigantes surrendered and were assigned lands to settle in beyond the imperial border, but which were apparently under Roman control (possibly seized from the "free Sarmatians" separately defeated earlier in the same year).

In 358, the Limigantes broke the terms of their treaty with Constantius and raided outside the territory assigned to them the previous year.

== Studies ==
George Vernadsky believed that the Agaragantes were Sarmatians and the Limigantes were Slavs.

== Sources ==
Primary

- Chronicle of Hieronymus of Milano (or Jerome)
- Ammianus Marcellinus

Secondary

- Vernadsky, George (1959). The Origins of Russia. Clarendon Press.
