= Spali =

The Spali (Latin: Spalaei, Spali, Palaei, Pali) was an ancient tribe mentioned in classical geography that inhabited the south of today's Ukraine.

Pliny (fl. 77–79) enumerated a group of tribes through which the Don River (Tanais) crossed, in which the Spalaei are last mentioned. He mentioned the conquerors of the Napaei as the Palaei (6, 50), while in another chapter (6, 22) says that it was the three Scythian tribes of Auchetae, Athernei and Asampatae that defeated them. It is believed that the Spalaei and Palaei are one and the same. Diodorus (2, 43) reported that the Spalaei/Palaei/Pali were descendants of Scythian king Palus, the son of Scythes. The mythical origin and chapter '6, 22' suggests that Spalaei/Palaei/Pali was a "collective designation of the eastern branch of Royal Scythians". As inferred from Pliny and Diodorus, the Auchetae (or Euchatae) were part of the Spalaei/Palaei/Pali. Herodotus (fl. 440 BC) stated that the Scythians or Scoloti consisted of the Auchatae (descending from Lipoxais), Catiaroi and Traspies (from Arpoxais), and Paralatae (from Colaxais), the latter being "the youngest of them, the royal race". Tadeusz Sulimirski believed that they were a branch of the Roxolani. Sulimirski attributed Sarmatian archaeology on the mid-Dnieper to the tribe, supported by the Sarmatians' downfall after the Gothic invasion in 200 AD. The "Royal Scythian" connection is supported by Indo-Parthian royal names Spalirisos, Spalyris, Spalahora, and the Slavic word ispolin, spolin ("giant"), assumed to date back to when Slavs were ruled by the Spalaei. Francis Dvornik (1893–1975) believed that the Sporoi mentioned by Procopius (500–560) reflect the old name of the Antes, and Sclaveni were probably the Spali mentioned by Jordanes (fl. 551) and Spalei mentioned by Pliny.

== Annotations ==
1. Satarcheos Herticheos Spondolicos Synthietas Anasos Issos Cataeetas Tagoras Caronos Neripos Agandaeos Meandaraeos Satharcheos S p a l a e o s
2. Haec ergo pars Gothorum, quae apud Filimer dicitur in terras Oium emenso amne transposita, optatum potiti solum, nec mora ilico ad gentem Spalorum adveniunt consertoque proelio victoriam adipiscunt, exindeque iam velut victores ad extremam Scythiae partem, que Ponto mari vicina est, properant.

== Sources ==
- Societas Uralo-Altaica (1973). Ural-Altaische Jahrbücher. Vol. 45–46. O. Harrassowitz.
- Vernadskij, G. (1938). "The Spali of Jordanis and the Spori of Procopius". Byzantion. 13 (1): 263–266. JSTOR 44168404.
