= Kambojas =

Iranian people mentioned in the Indo-Aryan sources

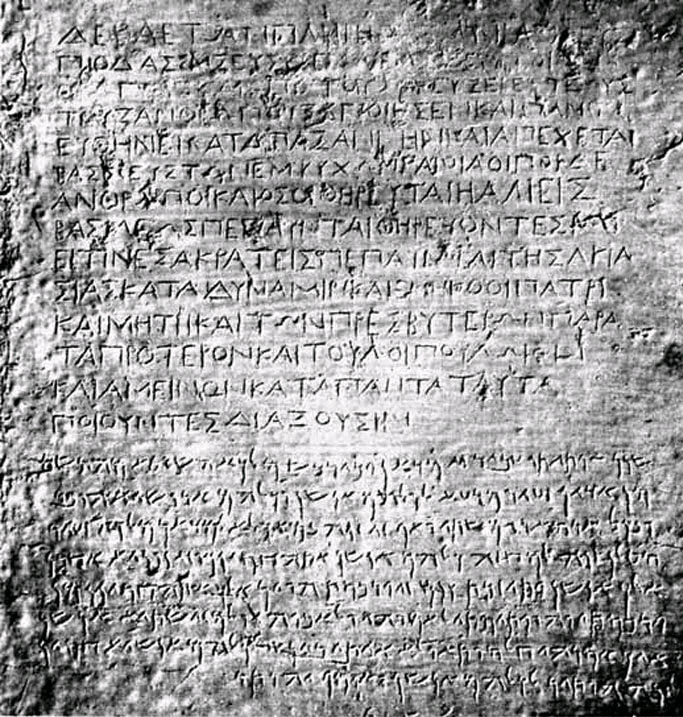
The Kandahar Bilingual Rock Inscription of Ashoka, in which the Kambojas are mentioned.

The Kambojas were a southeastern Iranian people who inhabited the northeastern most part of the territory populated by Iranian tribes, which bordered the Indian lands. They only appear in Indo-Aryan inscriptions and literature, being first attested during the later part of the Vedic period.

They spoke a language similar to Younger Avestan, whose words are considered to have been incorporated in the Aramao-Iranian version of the Kandahar Bilingual Rock Inscription erected by the Maurya emperor Ashoka (r. 268–232 BCE). They were adherents of Zoroastrianism, as demonstrated by their beliefs that insects, snakes, worms, frogs, and other small animals had to be killed, a practice mentioned in the Avestan Vendidad.

== Etymology ==
Kamboja- (later form Kāmboja-) was the name of their territory and identical to the Old Iranian name of *Kambauǰa-, whose meaning is uncertain. A long-standing theory is the one proposed by J. Charpentier in 1923, in which he suggests that the name is connected to the name of Cambyses I and Cambyses II (Kambū̌jiya or Kambauj in Old Persian), both kings from the Achaemenid dynasty. The theory has been discussed several times, but the issues that it posed were never persuadingly resolved.

In the same year, Sylvain Lévi proposed that the name is of Austroasiatic origin, though this is typically rejected.

== History ==
The Kambojas only appear in Indo-Aryan inscriptions and literature, being first attested during the later part of the Vedic period. The Naighaṇṭukas, a glossary and oldest surviving writing about Indian lexicography, is the first source to mention them. In his book about etymology—the Nirukta—the ancient Indian author Yaska comments on that part of the Naighaṇṭukas, in which he mentions that "the word śavati as a verb of motion is used only by the Kambojas", a statement that is more or less repeated in the exact same way by later authors, such as the grammarian Patanjali (2nd-century BCE) in his Mahabhashya. The word śavati is equivalent to š́iiauua- in Younger Avestan, which demonstrates that the Kambojas spoke an Iranian tongue with close ties to it. Modern historian M. Witzel surmised that grammarians and lexicographers must have first become acquainted with the word around 500 BCE or perhaps earlier, due to Yaska and Patanjali both using the same example known amongst grammarians and lexicographers.

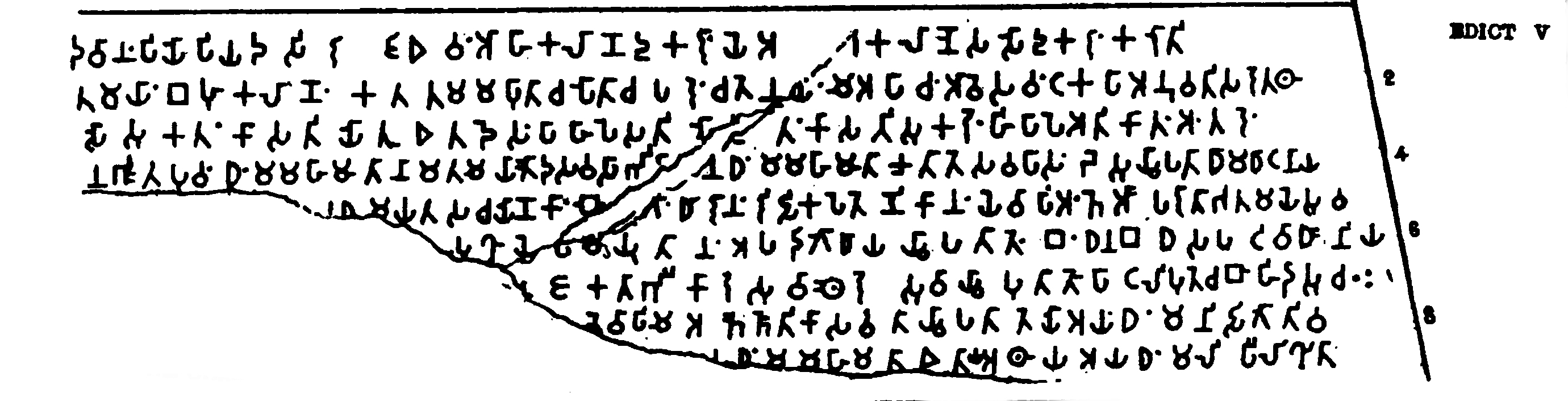
Drawing of the fifth Major Rock Edict of the Maurya emperor Ashoka (r. 268–232 BCE)

The Major Rock Edicts of the Maurya emperor Ashoka (r. 268–232 BCE) contain the first attestations of the Kambojas that can be precisely dated. The thirteenth edict says "among Greeks and Kambojas" and the fifth edict says "of Greeks, Kambojas and Gandharians". It is uncertain if Ashoka was only referring to just the Kambojas or all the Iranian tribes in his empire. Regardless, the mentioned groups of people were part of the Maurya Empire, being influenced by its politics, culture and religious traditions, and also adhered to ideology of "righteousness" set by Ashoka.

The major Indian epic Mahabharata also mentions the Kambojas, alongside the Greeks, Gandharas, Bactrians and Indo-Scythians. Geographical texts in Sanskrit and the Aṅguttara Nikāya include the Kambojas as one of the sixteen kingdoms of the Indian subcontinent during the lifetime of the Buddha. Various characteristics of the Kambojas are also described in different types of Sanskrit and Pali literature; they shaved themselves bald; they had a king; Rāja-pura- (meaning "King's town") was the name of their capital, but its site remains unknown. As was typical of Iranians, the Kambojas were renowned for their skill in horse breeding, and it is believed that the horses they produced were the most suitable for use in battle. These horses were brought into India in large quantities and also given as tribute. Indologist Etienne Lamotte further suggests that reputation of Kambojas as homeland of horses possibly earned the horse-breeders known as Aspasioi (from Old Persian aspa) and Assakenoi (from Sanskrit aśva "horse") their epithet.

Following the death of Ashoka, the Maurya Empire fell into decline. During the start of the 2nd-century BCE, they lost their Indian-Iranian frontier lands (including Gandhara and Arachosia) to the forces of Demetrius I (r. 200–180 BCE), the king of the Greco-Bactrian Kingdom. As a result, the Greek population of those areas were once again under the dominion of their Greek countrymen, while the Kambojas met other Iranians, as the Bactrians were likely a major component of the conquering army along with the Greeks.

Some historians consider the Kambojas to have established the Kamboja Pala dynasty in Bengal, but this remains uncertain. Some historians consider it to have founded by Kambojas who had settled in Bengal, a theory which may be supported by the attestation of a Kambojadeśa in the Lushai Hills by the Tibetan book Pag Sam Jon Zang. Hem Chandra Raychaudhuri proposed that the Kambojas may have travelled to Bengal from the northwestern frontier in the wake of Gurjara-Pratihara conquests during the lifetime of Narayanapala. He adds that those Kambojas perhaps acquired positions and, at a suitable time, seized power.

At Sithulpawwa Rajamaha Viharaya in the southern part of present-day Sri Lanka, three inscriptions mention the name "Kaboja", which Sri Lankan archaeologist and epigraphist Senarath Paranavithana suggested is related to the name "Kamboja". Similar variants of the name appears in other inscriptions in Sri Lanka, which has led to the suggestion that a group of Kambojan traders were active in Sri Lanka.

Richard Strand considers the Nuristani Kom people (aka Kamôzî or Kamôǰî) to be the descendants of the Kamboja people.

== Language and location ==
Location of the two inscription sites in present-day Afghanistan, whose engraved Iranian languages have been suggested to have been spoken by the Kambojas

The Kambojas inhabited the northeastern most part of the territory populated by Iranian tribes, which bordered the Indian lands. In 1918, Lévi suggested it to be Kafiristan, but later retracted it in 1923; B. Liebich suggested they lived in the Kabul Valley; J. Bloch suggested that they lived to the north-east of Kabul; Lamotte considered them to live them from Kafiristan to the southwestern part of Kashmir.

In 1958, a new suggestion was put forward by the French linguist Émile Benveniste. He drew a comparison between the Kambojas and Greeks described in Ashoka's edicts in Kandahar and the two languages it was written in; Greek and "Aramao-Iranian", which refers to the Iranian language hidden in the text of the Aramaic alphabet. Ashoka wanted to use these two languages to convey his religious message to the inhabitants of what is now present-day eastern Afghanistan, around the Gandhara area, approximately between Kabul and Kandahar. Because of this, Benveniste considered the Iranian language used in Ashoka's inscriptions to be spoken by the Kambojas. The Iranologists Mary Boyce and Frantz Grenet also support this view, saying that "The fact that Aramaic versions were made indicates that the Kambojas enjoyed a measure of autonomy, and that they not only preserved their Iranian identity, but were governed in some measure by members of their own community, on whom was laid the responsibility of transmitting to them the king's words, and having these engraved on stone."

Gérard Fussman suggested that the unidentified Iranian language of the two rock-inscriptions (IDN 3 and 5) in Dasht-e Nawar was spoken by the Kambojas, perhaps an early stage of the Ormuri language. According to Rüdiger Schmitt; "If this hypothesis should prove to be true, we would be able to locate the Kambojas more precisely in the mountains around Ghazni and on the Upper Arghandab."

== Religious beliefs ==
The Indo-Aryans considered the Kambojas to be "non-Aryan" (anariya-) strangers with their own peculiar traditions, as demonstrated in a portion of the Buddhist Jataka tales. Insects, snakes, worms, frogs, and other small animals had to be killed according to the Kambojas' religious beliefs. This practice has been linked by academics to the Avestan Vendidad for a long time, leading them to the conclusion that the Kambojas were adherents of Zoroastrianism. These beliefs are based on Zoroastrian dualism, which attributes the Evil Spirit to creatures like these and others that are poisonous or repulsive to humans. Hence, Zoroastrians were commanded to destroy them, and careful pursuit of this goal has been observed by outside spectators since the 5th-century BCE to the present.

== Notes ==
1. Scholarship agree that the Kambojas were Iranian. Richard N. Frye stated that "Their location and the meaning of the word Kamboja are much debated, but it is at least agreed that they were Iranians living to the northwest of the subcontinent."

== See also ==
- Kamboj
- Cambodia
- Khmer people
- Parama Kamboja kingdom
- Komedes
- Arta (Kamuia)
- Kingdom of Kapisa
- Parachi
- Saptarishi Tila statue
- Rishikas

== Sources ==
- Bailey, H. W. (1971). "Ancient Kamboja". In Clifford Edmund Bosworth (ed.). Iran and Islam: In Memory of the Late Vladimir Minorsky. Edinburgh University Press. pp. 65–71. ISBN 978-0085224201.
- Bopearachchi, Osmund (2025). "Ancient Kamboja". From Bactria to Taprobane: Selected Works of Osmund Bopearachchi. Volume II: Art History and Maritime Trade. Brill Publishers. ISBN 978-9350980705.
- Boyce, Mary; Grenet, Frantz (1991). Beck, Roger (ed.). A History of Zoroastrianism, Zoroastrianism under Macedonian and Roman Rule. Leiden: Brill. ISBN 978-9004293915.
- Caudhurī, Ābadula Mamina (1967). Dynastic History of Bengal, C. 750-1200 A.D. Asiatic Society of Pakistan.
- Eggermont, P.H.L. (1966). "The Murundas and the Ancient Trade-Route From Taxila To Ujjain". Journal of the Economic and Social History of the Orient. 9 (3). Brill: 257–296. doi:10.1163/156852066X00119.
- Emmerick, R. E. (1968). "Buddhism among Iranians". In Fischer, William B. (ed.). The Cambridge History of Iran. Vol. 3b. Cambridge: Cambridge University Press. pp. 949–964. ISBN 0-521-06935-1.
- Kubica, Olga (2023). Greco-Buddhist Relations in the Hellenistic Far East: Sources and Contexts. Routledge. ISBN 978-1032193007.
- Fussman, G. (1987). "Aśoka ii. Aśoka and Iran". In Yarshater, Ehsan (ed.). Encyclopædia Iranica. Vol. II/7:ʿArūż–Aśoka IV. London and New York: Routledge & Kegan Paul. pp. 779–785. ISBN 978-0-71009-107-9.
- Frye, R. N. (1984). The History of Ancient Iran. C.H. Beck. ISBN 978-3406093975.
- Lal, Deepak (2005). The Hindu Equilibrium: India C.1500 B.C. - 2000 A.D. Oxford University Press. p. xxxviii. ISBN 978-0-19-927579-3.
- Lamotte, Etienne Lamotte (1988). Webb-Boin, Sara (ed.). History Of Indian Buddhism. Peters Press. ISBN 978-9068311006.
- Schmitt, Rüdiger (2021). "Kamboja". In Yarshater, Ehsan (ed.). Encyclopædia Iranica (Online ed.). Encyclopædia Iranica Foundation.
- Scott, David Alan (1990). "The Iranian Face of Buddhism". East and West. 40 (1): 43–77. JSTOR 29756924. (registration required)
- Sharma, Ram Sharan (2007). "Chapter 15: Territorial States and the Rise of Magadha". India's Ancient Past. Oxford University Press. pp. 145–152. ISBN 9780199080366. "The rise of large states with towns as their base of operations strengthened the territorial idea. People owed strong allegiance to the janapada or the territory to which they belonged rather than to their jana or tribe. The Pali texts reveal that the janapadas grew into mahajanapadas. Gandhara and Kamboja were important mahajanapadas. Kamboja is called a janapada in Panini and a mahajanapada in the Pali texts."
