= 1922 in Iran =

- Decades
- See also: Other events of 1922; Years in Iran

The following lists events that happened during 1922 in Qajar era.

== Incumbents ==
- Monarch: Ahmad Shah Qajar
- Prime Minister: Ahmad Qavam (until January 21), Hassan Pirnia (January 21 – June 22), Ahmad Qavam (starting June 22)

== Births ==
- January 22 – Fereydoun Mirza Qajar, Qajar prince.
- February 6 – Rahim Moeini Kermanshahi, Iranian poet,historian.
- March 1 – Ali Reza Pahlavi (born 1922), Iranian Imperial.
- March 18 – Mehdi Azar Yazdi, Iranian writer.
- March 21 – Hossein Saoudipour, Iranian basketball player.
- March 22 – Farrokhroo Parsa, Iranian politician.
- March 22 – Ghamar Ariyan, Iranian writer, translator and essayist.
- May 3 – Ahmad Esfandiari, Iranian painter.
- May 3 – Safar Ghahremani, Revolutionary, political prisoner..
- June 13 – Parvin Soleimani, Iranian actress.
- September 22 – Hussein-Ali Montazeri, cleric and Deputy Supreme Leader of Iran from 1985 to 1989.
- September 23 – Abdolvahab Shahidi, Iranian musician.
- October 19 – Ebrahim Golestan, Iranian filmmaker and literary figure.
- October 23 – Heydar Ghiai, Iranian architect.
- November 21 – Amīr Aṣlān Afshār, Persian diplomat.
- November 23 – Amir Ali Sheibany, Iranian businessman.
- November 29 – Ali-Asghar Shahbazi, Iranian actor.
- December 2 – Ali Meshkini, Iranian cleric.
- December 22 – Manoucher Yektai, Iranian painter.
- December 30 – Mortezâ Varzi, Iranian musician.
- ? – Ali Murad Davudi, Iranian Baha'i leader.
- ? – Ali Salimi, 1922-1997 Azerbaijani musician.
- ? – Assadollah Rashidian, Iranian politician.
- ? – Aziz Dowlatabadi, poet.
- ? – Clara Abkar, Iranian-َArmenian painter.
- ? – Ezaddin Husseini, Iranian politician.
- ? – Hasan Arsanjani, Iranian politician.
- ? – Hossein-Ali Bayat, Iranian military personnel.
- ? – Mahmoud Shakibi, Iranian footballer.
- ? – Mehri Ahi, Iranian translator.
- ? – Mohammad Shahabi, Iranian musician.
- ? – Mohammad khan Zarghami, Iranian politician.
- ? – Nasser Farbod, Iranian politician.
- ? – Roza Montazemi, Iranian cookbook writer.
- ? – Uriel Davidi, Iranian rabbi.

== Deaths ==
- ? – Malek Mansur Mirza Shoa as-Saltaneh, Iranian politician.
- ? – Mirza Ebrahim Khan Sahhafbashi, Iranian photographer and cinematographer.
- ? – Mirza Jawad Agha Maleki Tabrizi, one of the contemporary Islamic scholars.
