= Iranian peoples =

Group of Indo-European peoples

Iranian/Iranic peoples
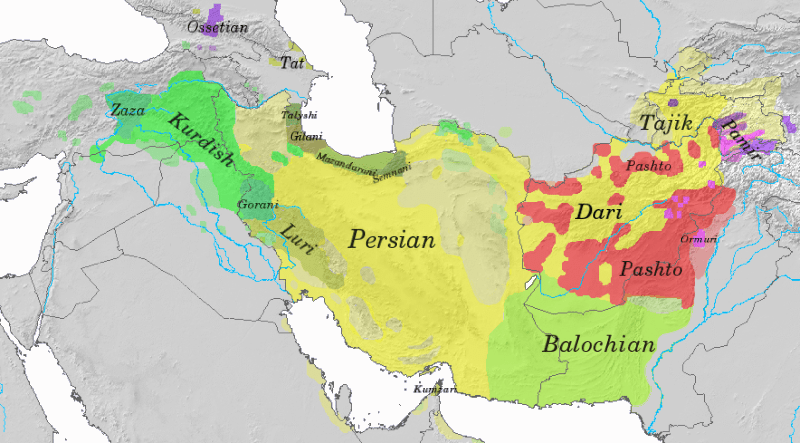
- Distribution of the Iranian languages

Total population
- est. 200 million

Regions with significant populations
- West Asia, incl. eastern Anatolia and parts of the Caucasus; parts of Central Asia, incl. western Xinjiang; and western parts of South Asia (historically also: Eastern Europe)

Languages
- Iranian languages (Iranic languages)

Religion
- Majority: Islam (Sunni and Shia); Minorities: Christianity (Eastern Orthodoxy, Nestorianism, Catholicism, and Protestantism), Judaism, Baháʼí Faith, Yazidism, Yarsanism, Zoroastrianism, Assianism (historically also: Iranian paganism, Buddhism, and Manichaeism)

Related ethnic groups
- Indo-Aryan peoples

Iranian peoples, or Iranic peoples, are a diverse collection of ethnolinguistic groups who are identified chiefly by their native usage of any of the Iranian languages, which are a branch of the Indo-Iranian languages within the Indo-European language family.

The Proto-Iranians are believed to have emerged as a separate branch of the Indo-Iranians in Central Asia around the mid-2nd millennium BC. At their peak of expansion in the mid-1st millennium BC, the territory of the Iranian peoples stretched across the entire Eurasian Steppe; from the Danubian Plains in the west to the Ordos Plateau in the east and the Iranian Plateau in the south.

The ancient Iranian peoples who emerged after the 1st millennium BC include the Alans, the Bactrians, the Dahae, the Khwarazmians, the Massagetae, the Medes, the Parthians, the Persians, the Sagartians, the Saka, the Sarmatians, the Scythians, the Sogdians, and likely the Cimmerians, among other Iranian-speaking peoples of West Asia, Central Asia, Eastern Europe, and the Eastern Steppe.

In the 1st millennium AD, their area of settlement, which was mainly concentrated in the steppes and deserts of Eurasia, was significantly reduced due to the expansion of the Slavic peoples, the Germanic peoples, the Turkic peoples, the Uralic peoples, the Mongolic peoples, and the Caucasian peoples; many were subjected to Slavicization and Turkification. Modern Iranian peoples include the Baloch, the Gilaks, the Kurds, the Lurs, the Mazanderanis, the Ossetians, the Pashtuns, the Persians, the Tats, the Tajiks, the Talysh, the Zazas and the Wakhis. Their current distribution spreads across the Iranian Plateau – stretching from the Caucasus in the north to the Persian Gulf in the south and from eastern Anatolia in the west to western Xinjiang in the east – covering a region that is sometimes called Greater Iran, representing the extent of the Iranian-speaking peoples and the reach of their geopolitical and cultural influence.

== Name ==
The term Iran derives directly from Middle Persian Ērān (𐭠𐭩𐭥𐭠𐭭) and Parthian Aryān (𐭀𐭓𐭉𐭀𐭍). The Middle Iranian terms ērān and aryān are oblique plural forms of gentilic ēr- (in Middle Persian) and ary- (in Parthian), both deriving from Old Persian ariya- (𐎠𐎼𐎡𐎹), Avestan airiia- (𐬀𐬌𐬭𐬌𐬌𐬀) and Proto-Iranian *arya-.

There have been many attempts to qualify the verbal root of ar- in Old Iranian arya-. The following are according to 1957 and later linguists:

- Emmanuel Laroche (1957): ara- "to fit" ("fitting", "proper").
  Old Iranian arya- being descended from Proto-Indo-European *ar-yo-, meaning "(skillfully) assembler".
- Georges Dumézil (1958): ar- "to share" (as a union).
- Harold Walter Bailey (1959): ar- "to beget" ("born", "nurturing").
- Émil Benveniste (1969): ar- "to fit" ("companionable").

Unlike the Sanskrit ārya- (Aryan), the Old Iranian term has solely an ethnic meaning. Today, the Old Iranian arya- remains in ethno-linguistic names such as Iran, Alan, Ir, and Iron.

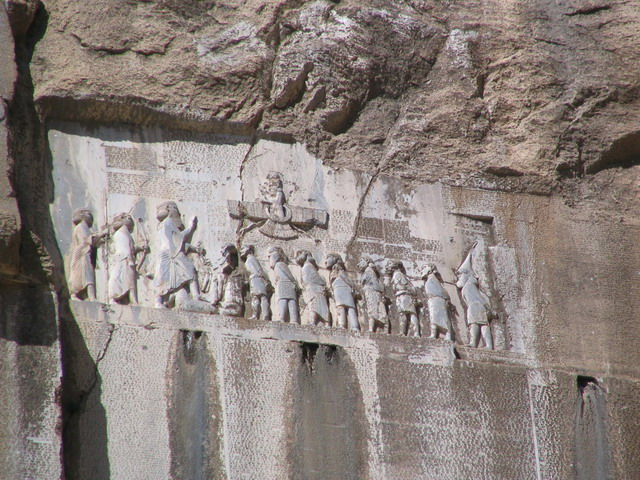
The Bistun Inscription of Darius the Great describes itself to have been composed in Arya [language or script].

In the Iranian languages, the gentilic is attested as a self-identifier included in ancient inscriptions and the literature of Avesta. (Note: In the Avesta the airiia- are members of the ethnic group of the Avesta-reciters themselves, in contradistinction to the anairiia-, the "non-Aryas". The word also appears four times in Old Persian: One is in the Behistun inscription, where ariya- is the name of a language or script (DB 4.89). The other three instances occur in Darius I's inscription at Naqsh-e Rustam (DNa 14–15), in Darius I's inscription at Susa (DSe 13–14), and in the inscription of Xerxes I at Persepolis (XPh 12–13). In these, the two Achaemenid dynasts describe themselves as pārsa pārsahyā puça ariya ariyaciça "a Persian, son of a Persian, an Ariya, of Ariya origin". "The phrase with ciça, "origin, descendance", assures that it [i.e. ariya] is an ethnic name wider in meaning than pārsa and not a simple adjectival epithet".) The earliest epigraphically attested reference to the word arya- occurs in the Bistun Inscription of the 6th century BC. The inscription of Bistun (or Behistun; Old Persian: Bagastana) describes itself to have been composed in Arya [language or script]. As is also the case for all other Old Iranian language usage, the arya of the inscription does not signify anything but Iranian.

In royal Old Persian inscriptions, the term arya- appears in three different contexts:

- As the name of the language of the Old Persian version of the inscription of Darius I in the Bistun Inscription.
- As the ethnic background of Darius the Great in inscriptions at Rustam Relief and Susa (Dna, Dse) and the ethnic background of Xerxes I in the inscription from Persepolis (Xph).
- As the definition of the God of Iranians, Ohrmazd, in the Elamite version of the Bistun Inscription.

In the Dna and Dse, Darius and Xerxes describe themselves as "an Achaemenid, a Persian, son of a Persian, and an Aryan, of Aryan stock". Although Darius the Great called his language arya- ("Iranian"), modern scholars refer to it as Old Persian because it is the ancestor of the modern Persian language.

The trilingual inscription erected by the command of Shapur I gives a more clear description. The languages used are Parthian, Middle Persian, and Greek. In Greek inscription says "ego ... tou Arianon ethnous despotes eimi", which translates to "I am the king of the kingdom (nation) of the Iranians". In Middle Persian, Shapur says "ērānšahr xwadāy hēm" and in Parthian he says "aryānšahr xwadāy ahēm".

The Avesta clearly uses airiia- as an ethnic name (Videvdat 1; Yasht 13.143–44, etc.), where it appears in expressions such as airyāfi daiŋˊhāvō ("Iranian lands"), airyō šayanəm ("land inhabited by Iranians"), and airyanəm vaējō vaŋhuyāfi dāityayāfi ("Iranian stretch of the good Dāityā"). In the late part of the Avesta (Videvdat 1), one of the mentioned homelands was referred to as Airyan'əm Vaējah which approximately means "expanse of the Iranians". The homeland varied in its geographic range, the area around Herat (Pliny's view) and even the entire expanse of the Iranian Plateau (Strabo's designation).

The Old Persian and Avestan evidence is confirmed by the Greek sources. Herodotus, in his Histories, remarks about the Iranian Medes that "Medes were called anciently by all people Arians" (7.62). In Armenian sources, the Parthians, Medes and Persians are collectively referred to as Iranians. Eudemus of Rhodes (Dubitationes et Solutiones de Primis Principiis, in Platonis Parmenidem) refers to "the Magi and all those of Iranian (áreion) lineage". Diodorus Siculus (1.94.2) considers Zoroaster (Zathraustēs) as one of the Arianoi.

Strabo, in his Geographica (1st century AD), mentions of the Medes, Persians, Bactrians and Sogdians of the Iranian Plateau and Transoxiana of antiquity:

The name of Ariana is further extended to a part of Persia and of Media, as also to the Bactrians and Sogdians on the north; for these speak approximately the same language, with but slight variations.

— Geographica, 15.8

The Bactrian (a Middle Iranian language) inscription of Kanishka (the founder of the Kushan Empire) at Rabatak, which was discovered in 1993 in an unexcavated site in the Afghan province of Baghlan, clearly refers to this Eastern Iranian language as Arya.

All this evidence shows that the name Arya was a collective definition, denoting peoples who were aware of belonging to the one ethnic stock, speaking a common language, and having a religious tradition that centered on the cult of Ohrmazd.

The academic usage of the term Iranian is distinct from the state of Iran and its various citizens (who are all Iranian by nationality), in the same way that the term Germanic peoples is distinct from Germans. Some inhabitants of Iran are not necessarily ethnic Iranians by virtue of not being speakers of Iranian languages.

=== Iranian vs. Iranic ===
Some scholars such as John Perry prefer the term Iranic as the name for the linguistic family of this category (many of which are spoken outside Iran), while Iranian for anything about the country Iran. He uses the same analogue as in differentiating German from Germanic or differentiating Turkish and Turkic. German scholar Martin Kümmel also argues for the same distinction of Iranian from Iranic.

== History and settlement ==
=== Indo-European roots ===
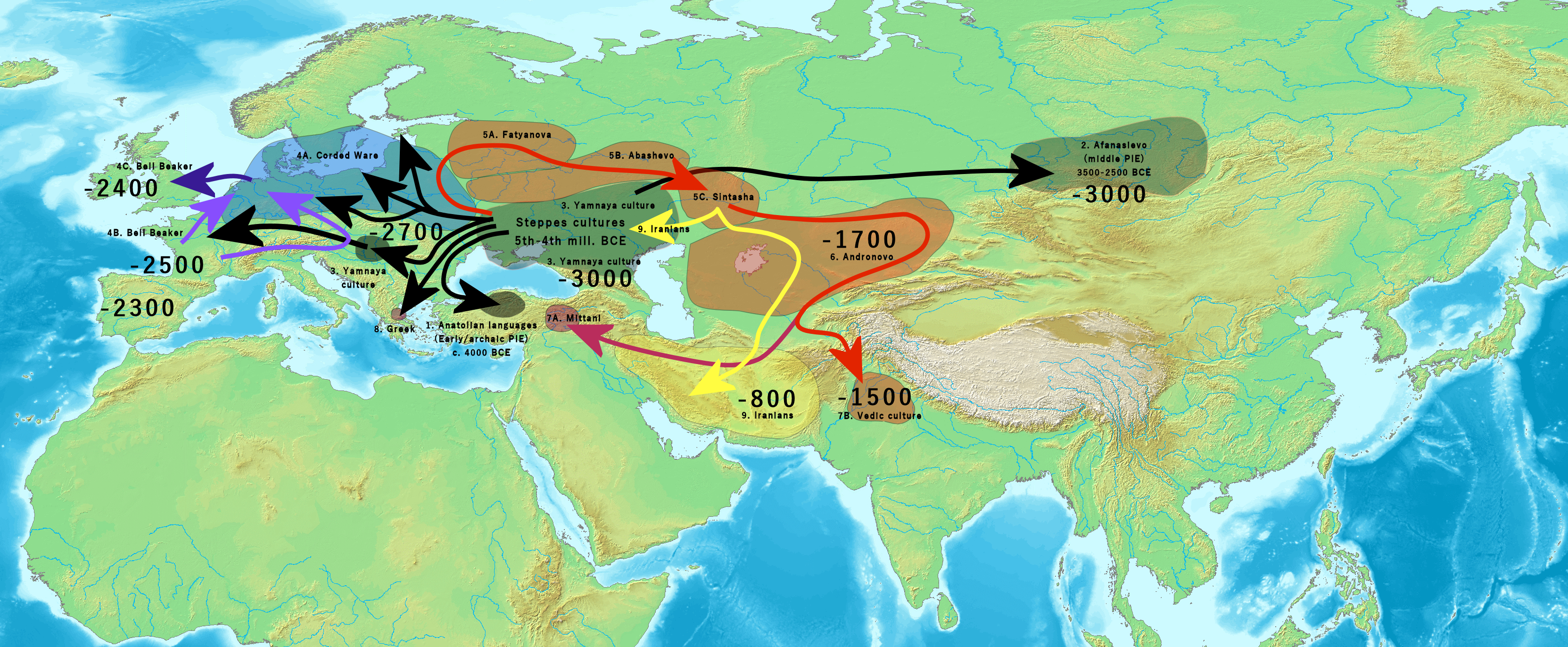
Early Indo-European migrations from the Pontic–Caspian steppe and across Central Asia.

==== Proto-Indo-Iranians ====
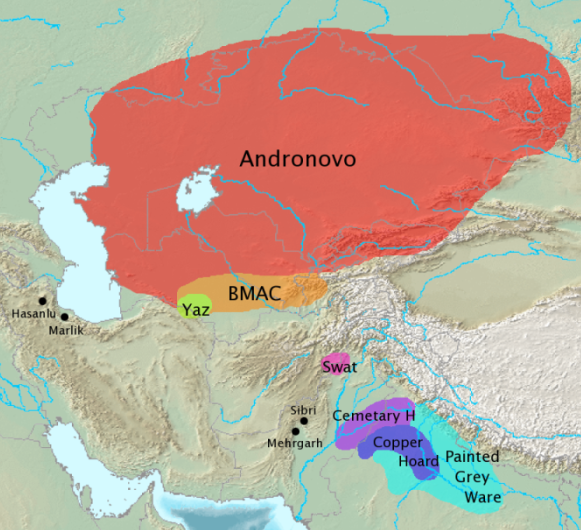
Archaeological cultures associated with Indo-Iranian migrations (after EIEC). The Andronovo, BMAC and Yaz cultures have often been associated with it. The GGC (Swat), Cemetery H, Copper Hoard and PGW cultures are candidates for the same associations.

The Proto-Indo-Iranians are commonly identified with the Sintashta culture and the subsequent Andronovo culture within the broader Andronovo horizon, and their homeland with an area of the Eurasian steppe that borders the Ural River on the west and the Tian Shan on the east.

The Indo-Iranian migrations took place in two waves. The first wave consisted of the Indo-Aryan migration through the Bactria-Margiana Culture, also called "Bactria-Margiana Archaeological Complex", into the Levant, founding the Mitanni kingdom; and a migration south-eastward of the Vedic people, over the Hindu Kush into northern India. The Indo-Aryans split off around 1800–1600 BC from the Iranians, whereafter they were defeated and split into two groups by the Iranians, who dominated the Central Eurasian steppe zone and "chased [the Indo-Aryans] to the extremities of Central Eurasia". One group were the Indo-Aryans who founded the Mitanni kingdom in northern Syria; (c. 1500 – c. 1300 BC) the other group were the Vedic people. Christopher I. Beckwith suggests that the Wusun, an Indo-European Caucasian people of Inner Asia in antiquity, were also of Indo-Aryan origin.

The second wave is interpreted as the Iranian wave, and took place in the third stage of the Indo-European migrations from 800 BC onwards.

==== Sintashta–Petrovka culture ====
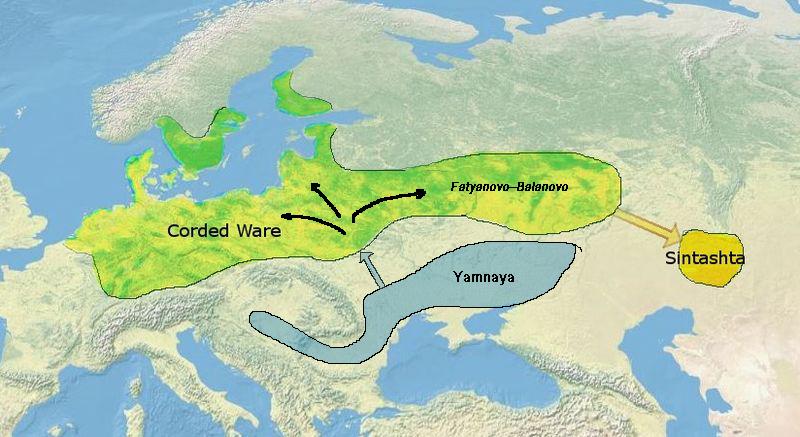
According to Allentoft (2015), the Sintashta culture probably derived from the Corded Ware culture.

The Sintashta culture, also known as the Sintashta–Petrovka culture or Sintashta–Arkaim culture, is a Bronze Age archaeological culture of the northern Eurasian steppe on the borders of Eastern Europe and Central Asia, dated to the period 2100–1800 BC. It is probably the archaeological manifestation of the Indo-Iranian language group.

The Sintashta culture emerged from the interaction of two antecedent cultures. Its immediate predecessor in the Ural-Tobol steppe was the Poltavka culture, an offshoot of the cattle-herding Yamnaya horizon that moved east into the region between 2800 and 2600 BC. Several Sintashta towns were built over older Poltavka settlements or close to Poltavka cemeteries, and Poltavka motifs are common on Sintashta pottery. Sintashta material culture also shows the influence of the late Abashevo culture, a collection of Corded Ware settlements in the forest steppe zone north of the Sintashta region that were also predominantly pastoralist. Allentoft et al. (2015) also found close autosomal genetic relationship between peoples of Corded Ware culture and Sintashta culture.

The earliest known chariots have been found in Sintashta burials, and the culture is considered a strong candidate for the origin of the technology, which spread throughout the Old World and played an important role in ancient warfare. Sintashta settlements are also remarkable for the intensity of copper mining and bronze metallurgy carried out there, which is unusual for a steppe culture.

Because of the difficulty of identifying the remains of Sintashta sites beneath those of later settlements, the culture was only recently distinguished from the Andronovo culture. It is now recognised as a separate entity forming part of the 'Andronovo horizon'.

==== Andronovo culture ====
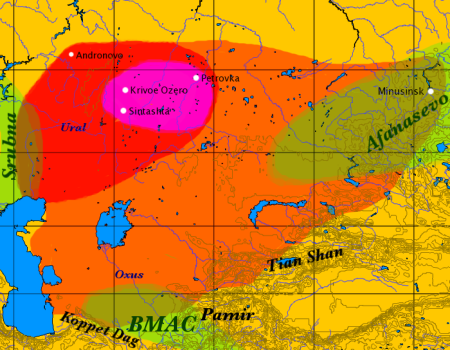
The Andronovo culture's approximate maximal extent, with the formative Sintashta-Petrovka culture (red), the location of the earliest spoke-wheeled chariot finds (purple), and the adjacent and overlapping Afanasevo, Srubna, and BMAC cultures (green).

The Andronovo culture is a collection of similar local Bronze Age Indo-Iranian cultures that flourished c. 1800–900 BC in western Siberia and the west Asiatic steppe. It is probably better termed an archaeological complex or archaeological horizon. The name derives from the village of Andronovo (55°53′N 55°42′E), where in 1914, several graves were discovered, with skeletons in crouched positions, buried with richly decorated pottery. The older Sintashta culture (2100–1800), formerly included within the Andronovo culture, is now considered separately, but regarded as its predecessor, and accepted as part of the wider Andronovo horizon. At least four sub-cultures of the Andronovo horizon have been distinguished, during which the culture expands towards the south and the east:

- Sintashta-Petrovka-Arkaim (Southern Urals, northern Kazakhstan, 2200–1600 BC)
  - the Sintashta fortification of ca. 1800 BC in Chelyabinsk Oblast
  - the Petrovka settlement fortified settlement in Kazakhstan
  - the nearby Arkaim settlement dated to the 17th century
- Alakul (2100–1400 BC) between Oxus and Jaxartes, Kyzylkum desert
  - Alekseyevka (1300–1100 BC "final Bronze") in eastern Kazakhstan, contacts with Namazga VI in Turkmenia
  - Ingala Valley in the south of the Tyumen Oblast
- Fedorovo (1500–1300 BC) in southern Siberia (earliest evidence of cremation and fire cult)
  - Beshkent-Vakhsh (1000–800 BC)

The geographical extent of the culture is vast and difficult to delineate exactly. On its western fringes, it overlaps with the approximately contemporaneous, but distinct, Srubna culture in the Volga-Ural interfluvial. To the east, it reaches into the Minusinsk depression, with some sites as far west as the southern Ural Mountains, overlapping with the area of the earlier Afanasevo culture. Additional sites are scattered as far south as the Koppet Dag (Turkmenistan), the Pamir (Tajikistan) and the Tian Shan (Kyrgyzstan). The northern boundary vaguely corresponds to the beginning of the Taiga. In the Volga basin, interaction with the Srubna culture was the most intense and prolonged, and Federovo style pottery is found as far west as Volgograd.

Most researchers associate the Andronovo horizon with early Indo-Iranian languages, though it may have overlapped the early Uralic-speaking area at its northern fringe.

The archeological features of the Yaz I culture are seen as the results of the intrusion of nomadic Indo-Iranians from the northern Andronovo culture and their interaction with indigenous traditions from the preceding BMAC culture.

=== Scythians and Persians ===
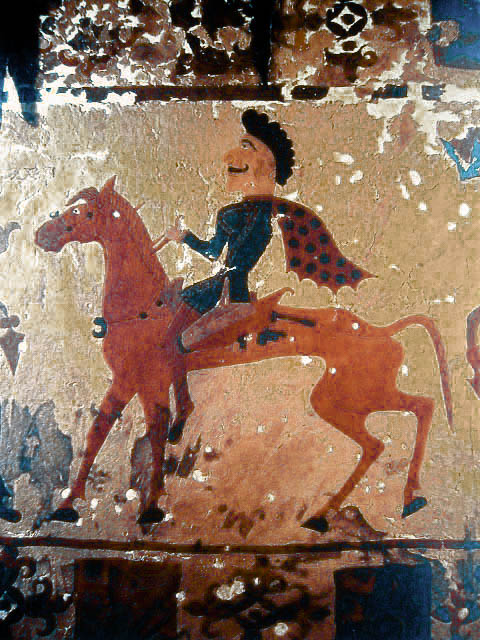
Saka horseman, Pazyryk, from a carpet, c. 300 BC

From the late 2nd millennium BC to early 1st millennium BC the Iranians had expanded from the Eurasian Steppe, and Iranian peoples such as Medes, Persians, Parthians and Bactrians populated the Iranian Plateau.

Scythian tribes, along with Cimmerians, Sarmatians and Alans populated the steppes north of the Black Sea. The Scythian and Sarmatian tribes were spread across Great Hungarian Plain, South-Eastern Ukraine, Russias Siberian, Southern, Volga, Uralic regions and the Balkans, while other Scythian tribes, such as the Saka, spread as far east as Xinjiang, China.

=== Western and Eastern Iranians ===
The division into an "Eastern" and a "Western" group by the early 1st millennium is visible in Avestan vs. Old Persian, the two oldest known Iranian languages. The Old Avestan texts known as the Gathas are believed to have been composed by Zoroaster, the founder of Zoroastrianism, with the Yaz culture (c. 1500 BC – 1100 BC) as a candidate for the development of Eastern Iranian culture.

==== Western Iranian peoples ====
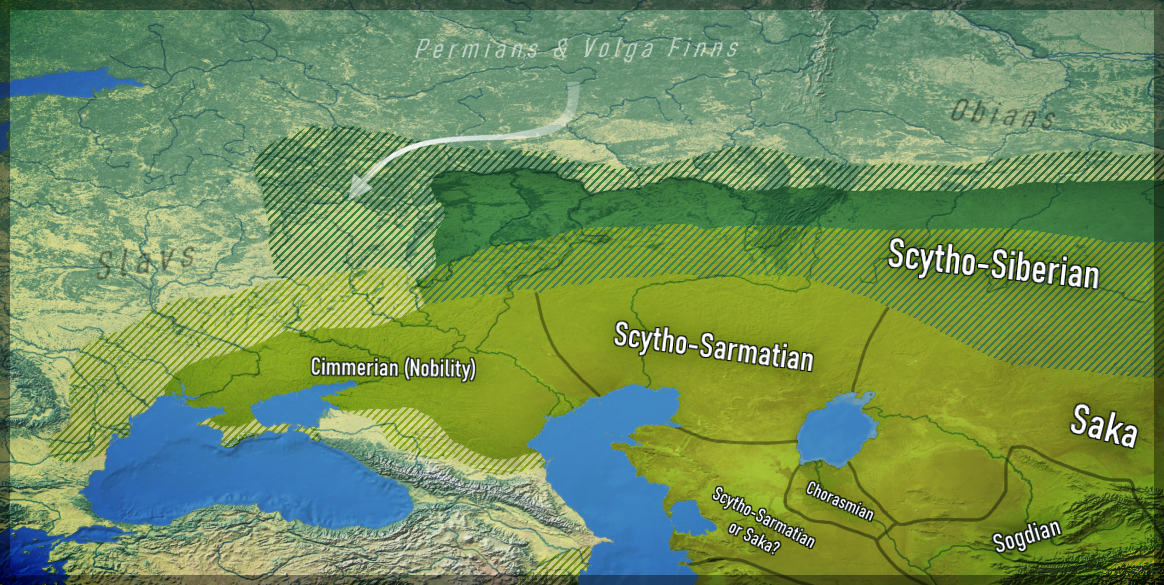
Distribution of Iranic peoples during the Iron Age

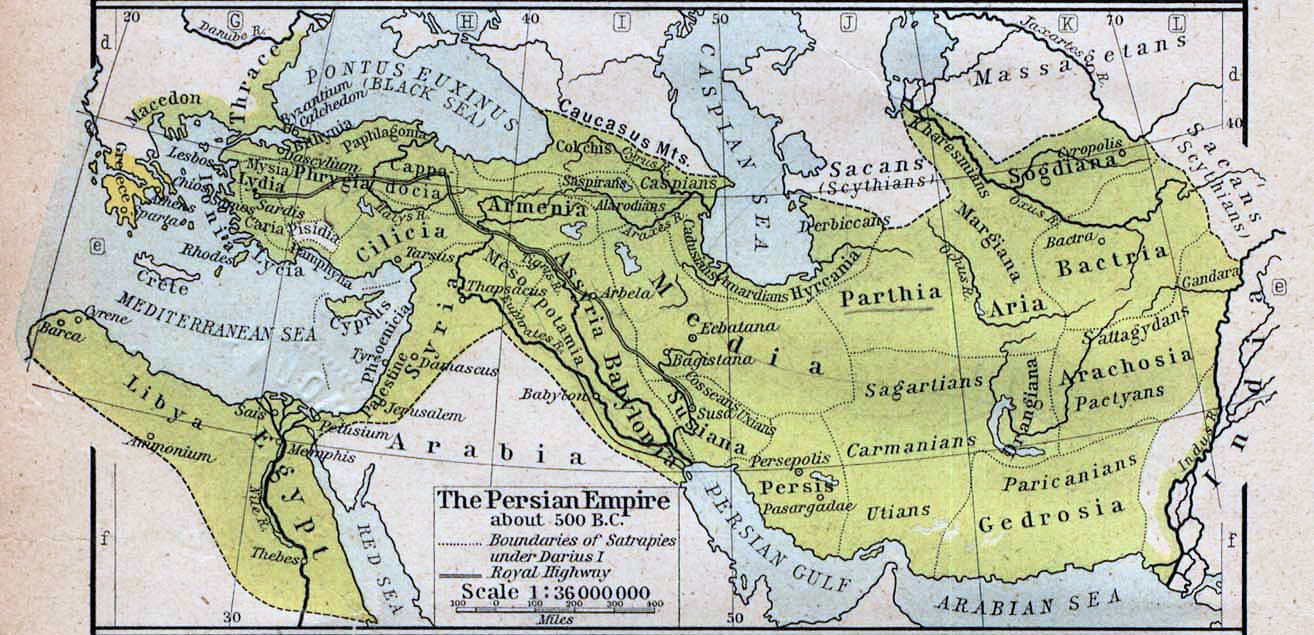
Achaemenid Empire at its greatest extent under the rule of Darius I (522–486 BC)

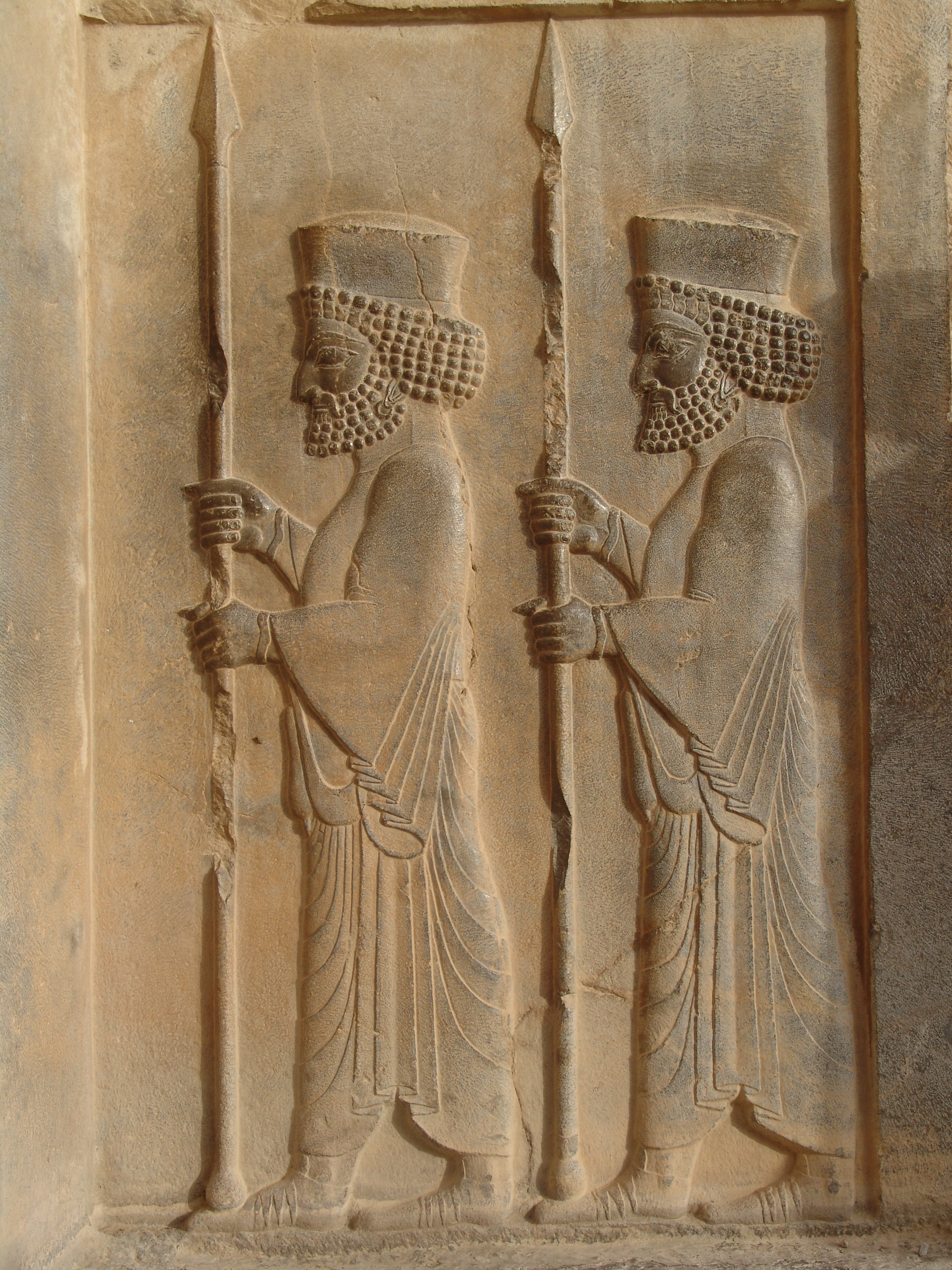
Persepolis: Persian guards

During the 1st centuries of the 1st millennium BC, the ancient Persians established themselves in the western portion of the Iranian Plateau and appear to have interacted considerably with the Elamites and Babylonians, while the Medes also entered in contact with the Assyrians. Remnants of the Median language and Old Persian show their common Proto-Iranian roots, emphasized in Strabo and Herodotus' description of their languages as very similar to the languages spoken by the Bactrians and Sogdians in the east. Following the establishment of the Achaemenid Empire, the Persian language (referred to as "Farsi" in Persian after being changed from Parsi) spread from Pars or Fars province (Persia) to various regions of the Empire, with the modern dialects of Iran, Afghanistan (also known as Dari) and Central-Asia (known as Tajiki) descending from Old Persian.

At first, the Western Iranian peoples in the Near East were dominated by the various Assyrian empires. An alliance of the Medes with the Persians, and rebelling Babylonians, Scythians, Chaldeans, and Cimmerians, helped the Medes to capture Nineveh in 612 BC, which resulted in the eventual collapse of the Neo-Assyrian Empire by 605 BC. The Medes were subsequently able to establish their Median kingdom (with Ecbatana as their royal centre) beyond their original homeland and had eventually a territory stretching roughly from northeastern Iran to the Halys River in Anatolia. After the fall of the Assyrian Empire, between 616 BC and 605 BC, a unified Median state was formed, which, together with Babylonia, Lydia, and Egypt, became one of the four major powers of the ancient Near East

Later on, in 550 BC, Cyrus the Great, would overthrow the leading Median rule, and conquer Kingdom of Lydia and the Babylonian Empire after which he established the Achaemenid Empire (or the First Persian Empire), while his successors would dramatically extend its borders. At its greatest extent, the Achaemenid Empire would encompass swaths of territory across three continents, namely Europe, Africa and Asia, stretching from the Balkans and Eastern Europe proper in the west, to the Indus Valley in the east. The largest empire of ancient history, with their base in Persis (although the main capital was located in Babylon) the Achaemenids would rule much of the known ancient world for centuries. This First Persian Empire was equally notable for its successful model of a centralised, bureaucratic administration (through satraps under a king) and a government working to the profit of its subjects, for building infrastructure such as a postal system and road systems and the use of an official language across its territories and a large professional army and civil services (inspiring similar systems in later empires), and for emancipation of slaves including the Jewish exiles in Babylon, and is noted in Western history as the antagonist of the Greek city states during the Greco-Persian Wars. The Mausoleum at Halicarnassus, one of the Seven Wonders of the Ancient World, was built in the empire as well.

The Greco-Persian Wars resulted in the Persians being forced to withdraw from their European territories, setting the direct further course of history of Greece and the rest of Europe. More than a century later, a prince of Macedon (which itself was a subject to Persia from the late 6th century BC up to the First Persian invasion of Greece) later known by the name of Alexander the Great, overthrew the incumbent Persian king, by which the Achaemenid Empire was ended.

Old Persian is attested in the Behistun Inscription (c. 519 BC), recording a proclamation by Darius the Great. In southwestern Iran, the Achaemenid kings usually wrote their inscriptions in trilingual form (Elamite, Babylonian and Old Persian) while elsewhere other languages were used. The administrative languages were Elamite in the early period, and later Imperial Aramaic, as well as Greek, making it a widely used bureaucratic language. Even though the Achaemenids had extensive contacts with the Greeks and vice versa, and had conquered many of the Greek-speaking area's both in Europe and Asia Minor during different periods of the empire, the native Old Iranian sources provide no indication of Greek linguistic evidence. However, there is plenty of evidence (in addition to the accounts of Herodotus) that Greeks, apart from being deployed and employed in the core regions of the empire, also evidently lived and worked in the heartland of the Achaemenid Empire, namely Iran. For example, Greeks were part of the various ethnicities that constructed Darius' palace in Susa, apart from the Greek inscriptions found nearby there, and one short Persepolis tablet written in Greek.

The early inhabitants of the Achaemenid Empire appear to have adopted the religion of Zoroastrianism. The Baloch who speak a west Iranian language relate an oral tradition regarding their migration from Aleppo, Syria around the year 1000 AD, whereas linguistic evidence links Balochi to Kurmanji, Soranî, Gorani.

==== Eastern Iranian peoples ====
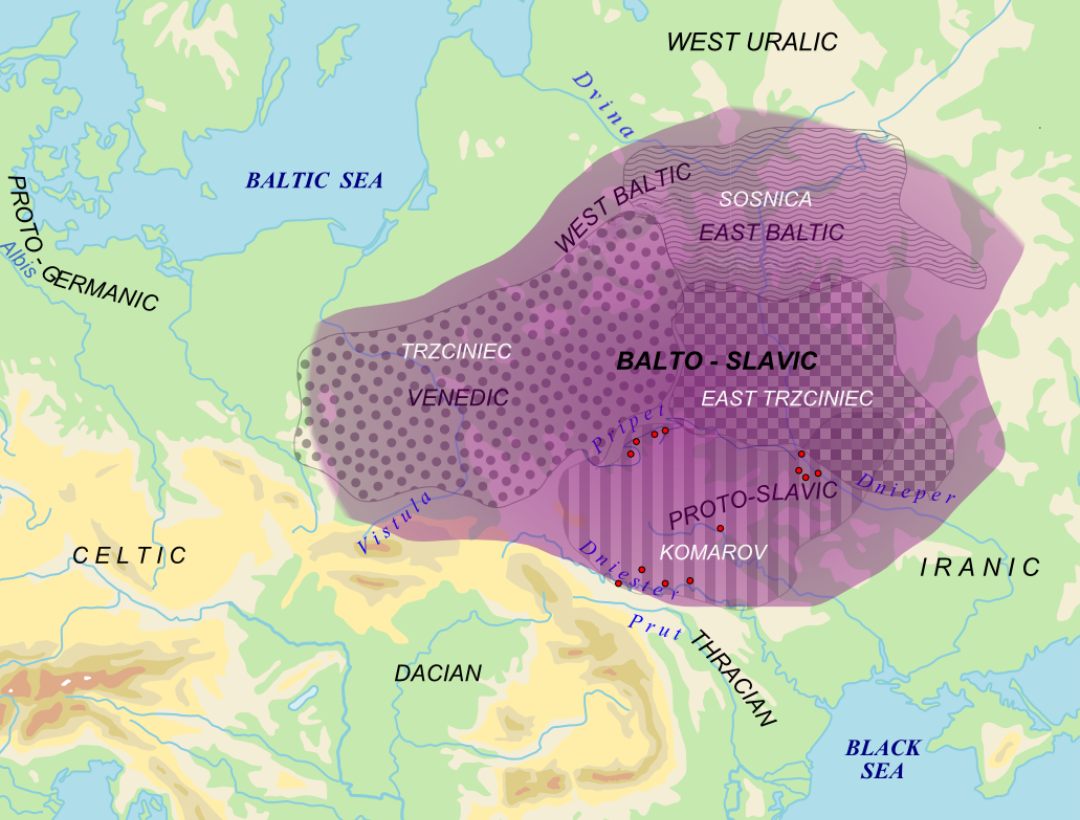
The Eastern Iranic and Balto-Slavic dialect continuums in Eastern Europe, the latter with proposed material cultures correlating to speakers of Balto-Slavic in the Bronze Age (white). Red dots = archaic Slavic hydronyms

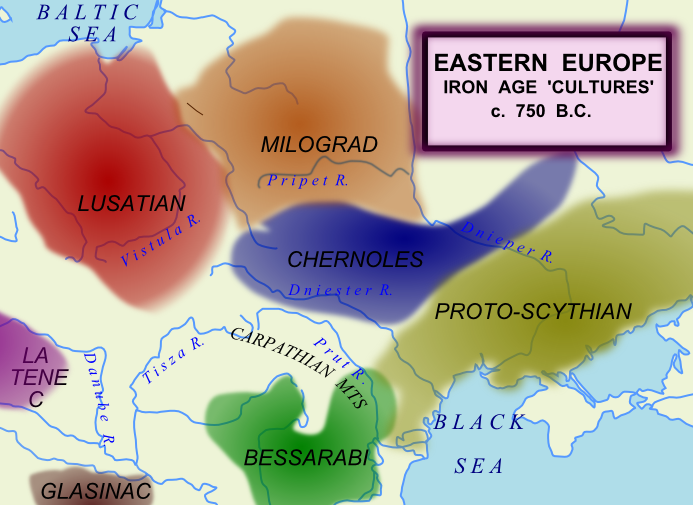
Archaeological cultures c. 750 BC at the start of Eastern-Central Europe's Iron Age; the Proto-Scythian culture borders the Balto-Slavic cultures (Lusatian, Milograd and Chernoles)

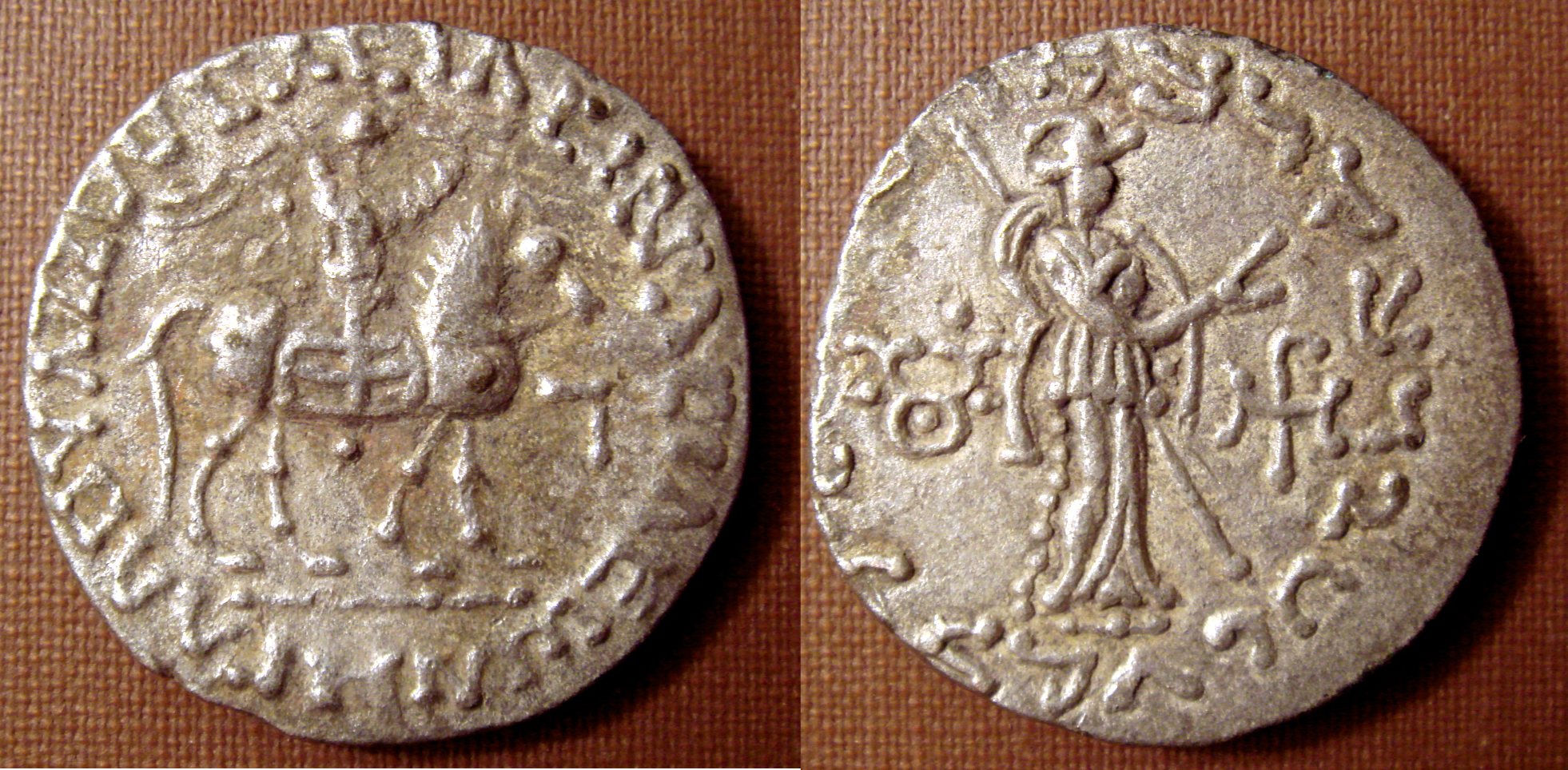
Silver coin of the Indo-Scythian king Azes II (reigned c. 35–12 BC). Buddhist triratna symbol in the left field on the reverse

While the Iranian tribes of the south are better known through their texts and modern counterparts, the tribes which remained largely in the vast Eurasian expanse are known through the references made to them by the ancient Greeks, Persians, Chinese, and Indo-Aryans as well as by archaeological finds. The Greek chronicler, Herodotus (5th century BC) makes references to a nomadic people, the Scythians; he describes them as having dwelt in what is today southern European Russia and Ukraine. He was the first to make a reference to them. Many ancient Sanskrit texts from a later period make references to such tribes they were witness of pointing them towards the southeasternmost edges of Central Asia, around the Hindukush range in northern Pakistan.

It is believed that these Scythians were conquered by their eastern cousins, the Sarmatians, who are mentioned by Strabo as the dominant tribe which controlled the southern Russian steppe in the 1st millennium AD. These Sarmatians were also known to the Romans, who conquered the western tribes in the Balkans and sent Sarmatian conscripts, as part of Roman legions, as far west as Roman Britain. These Iranian-speaking Scythians and Sarmatians dominated large parts of Eastern Europe for a millennium, and were eventually absorbed and assimilated (e.g. Slavicisation) by the Proto-Slavic population of the region.

The Sarmatians differed from the Scythians in their veneration of the god of fire rather than god of nature, and women's prominent role in warfare, which possibly served as the inspiration for the Amazons. At their greatest reported extent, around the 1st century AD, these tribes ranged from the Vistula River to the mouth of the Danube and eastward to the Volga, bordering the shores of the Black and Caspian Seas as well as the Caucasus to the south. (Note: Apollonius (Argonautica, iii) envisaged the Sauromatai as the bitter foe of King Aietes of Colchis (modern Georgia).) Their territory, which was known as Sarmatia to Greco-Roman ethnographers, corresponded to the western part of greater Scythia (mostly modern Ukraine and Southern Russia, also to a smaller extent north eastern Balkans around Moldova). According to authors Arrowsmith, Fellowes and Graves Hansard in their book A Grammar of Ancient Geography published in 1832, Sarmatia had two parts, Sarmatia Europea and Sarmatia Asiatica covering a combined area of 503,000 sq mi or 1,302,764 km^{2}.

Throughout the 1st millennium AD, the large presence of the Sarmatians who once dominated Ukraine, Southern Russia, and swaths of the Carpathians, gradually started to diminish mainly due to assimilation and absorption by the Germanic Goths, especially from the areas near the Roman frontier, but only completely by the Proto-Slavic peoples. The abundant East Iranian-derived toponyms in Eastern Europe proper (e.g. some of the largest rivers; the Dniestr and Dniepr), as well as loanwords adopted predominantly through the Eastern Slavic languages and adopted aspects of Iranian culture amongst the early Slavs, are all a remnant of this. A connection between Proto-Slavonic and Iranian languages is also furthermore proven by the earliest layer of loanwords in the former. For instance, the Proto-Slavonic words for god (*bogъ), demon (*divъ), house (*xata), axe (*toporъ) and dog (*sobaka) are of Scythian origin.

The extensive contact between these Scytho-Sarmatian Iranian tribes in Eastern Europe and the (Early) Slavs included religion. After Slavic and Baltic languages diverged the Early Slavs interacted with Iranian peoples and merged elements of Iranian spirituality into their beliefs. For example, both Early Iranian and Slavic supreme gods were considered givers of wealth, unlike the supreme thunder gods in many other European religions. Also, both Slavs and Iranians had demons –- given names from similar linguistic roots, Daêva (Iranian) and Divŭ (Slavic) –- and a concept of dualism, of good and evil.

The Sarmatians of the east, based in the Pontic–Caspian steppe, became the Alans, who also ventured far and wide, with a branch ending up in Western Europe and then North Africa, as they accompanied the Germanic Vandals and Suebi during their migrations. The modern Ossetians are believed to be the direct descendants of the Alans, as other remnants of the Alans disappeared following Germanic, Hunnic and ultimately Slavic migrations and invasions. Another group of Alans allied with Goths to defeat the Romans and ultimately settled in what is now called Catalonia (Goth-Alania).

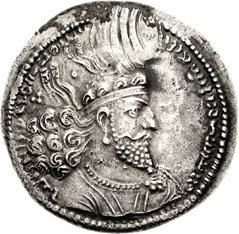
Hormizd I, Sassanian coin

Some of the Saka-Scythian tribes in Central Asia would later move further southeast and invade the Iranian Plateau, large sections of present-day Afghanistan and finally deep into present day Pakistan (see Indo-Scythians). Another Iranian tribe related to the Saka-Scythians were the Parni in Central Asia, and who later become indistinguishable from the Parthians, speakers of a northwest-Iranian language. Many Iranian tribes, including the Khwarazmians, Massagetae and Sogdians, were assimilated and/or displaced in Central Asia by the migrations of Turkic tribes emanating out of Xinjiang and Siberia.

The modern Sarikoli in southern Xinjiang and the Ossetians of the Caucasus (mainly South Ossetia and North Ossetia) are remnants of the various Scythian-derived tribes from the vast far and wide territory they once dwelled in. The modern Ossetians are the descendants of the Alano-Sarmatians, and their claims are supported by their Northeast Iranian language, while culturally the Ossetians resemble their North Caucasian neighbors, the Kabardians and Circassians. Various extinct Iranian peoples existed in the eastern Caucasus, including the Azaris, while some Iranian peoples remain in the region, including the Talysh and the Tats found in Azerbaijan and as far north as the Russian republic of Dagestan. A remnant of the Sogdians is found in the Yaghnobi-speaking population in parts of the Zeravshan valley in Tajikistan.

=== Later developments ===
The main migration of Turkic peoples occurred between the 6th and 10th centuries, when they spread across most of Central Asia. The Turkic peoples slowly replaced and assimilated the previous Iranian-speaking locals, turning the population of Central Asia from being largely Iranian into being primarily of East Asian descent.

Starting with the reign of Omar in 634 AD, Muslim Arabs began a conquest of the Iranian Plateau. The Arabs conquered the Sassanid Empire of the Persians and seized much of the Byzantine Empire populated by the Kurds and others. Ultimately, the various Iranian peoples, including the Persians, Pashtuns, Kurds and Balochis, converted to Islam, while the Alans converted to Christianity, thus laying the foundation for the fact that the modern-day Ossetians are Christian. The Iranian peoples would later split along sectarian lines as the Persians adopted the Shi'a sect. As ancient tribes and identities changed, so did the Iranian peoples, many of whom assimilated foreign cultures and peoples.

Later, during the 2nd millennium AD, the Iranian peoples would play a prominent role during the age of Islamic expansion and empire. Saladin, a noted adversary of the Crusaders, was an ethnic Kurd, while various empires centered in Iran (including the Safavids) re-established a modern dialect of Persian as the official language spoken throughout much of what is today Iran and the Caucasus. Iranian influence was also an principal factor in the Ottoman Empire. The Ottoman Turks integrated Persian into their court, governance, and daily life. Supported by the sultans, nobility, and spiritual leaders, Persian was promoted as a second language, intertwining with Turkish and greatly influencing Ottoman cultural traditions. However, a heavy Turko-Persian basis in Anatolia was set already by the predecessors of the Ottomans, namely the Sultanate of Rum and Anatolian Beyliks amongst others) as well to the court of the Mughal Empire. All of the major Iranian peoples reasserted their use of Iranian languages following the decline of Arab rule, but would not begin to form modern national identities until the 19th and early 20th centuries.

=== Persian nationalism ===
Geographic distribution of modern Iranian languages

With the rise of Reza Shah Pahlavi in 1925, Persian nationalism became a central instrument of state power, framed by the motto of "one nation, one language, one country." Modern Iranian national identity was closely tied to the Persian language, which was promoted as the primary marker of unity. State policies and practices reflected systematic repression of non-Persian peoples, including Kurds, Arabs, Lurs, Qashqai, and Bakhtiari. Under Reza Shah's rule, the Imperial state of Iran emphasized cultural and linguistic homogenization, promoting the Persian language as a symbol of national unity while restricting the public use of minority languages. State policies disproportionately benefited Persian-dominated regions, contributing to the political and economic marginalization of ethnic minorities. Reza Shah's successor, Mohammea Reza Pahlavi, allowed limited use of minority languages within tightly regulated settings, while Persian remained dominant. As non-Persian languages were confined to private spheres without legal protection, the usual result was language loss. Persian elites continued marginalizing them as "regional dialects." Zoroastrian symbols were often promoted by the state to connect Iran to its ancient pre-Islamic past. Nationalist thought expanded from anti-Arab sentiment to broader hostility toward non-Persian identities. Persianism and Shia Islam emerged as the ideological foundations of Iranian nationalism, shaping what scholars describe as a "Persian psycho-nationalist habitus." Thinkers such as Jalal Al-e-Ahmad and Taqi Arani, who advanced racialized theories of language and nationhood, further institutionalized the idea of Persian as the unifying and authentic essence of the Iranian nation-state.

Following the 1979 Iranian Revolution, the Islamic Republic shifted Iranian identity from the secular Persian nationalism of the Pahlavi era to Shia Islamism. At the same time, elements of Persian-centric nationalism persisted within state discourse and governance, alongside efforts to promote a more uniform Iranian nationalism reflective of all the diverse ethnicities in Iran. In contrast to the Pahlavi monarchy's emphasis on ethnic and linguistic homogenization, the Islamic Republic's exclusionary practices have been more strongly articulated along sectarian and religious lines, particularly through discrimination against Sunni Muslims and non-Muslim communities.

This nationalistic approach extended as far as to the Gulf Arab states where the Iranian migrants lived; as such, anything that happened in Iran that was annoying to these countries, the pressure was immediately put on Iranians living in Bahrain, in Kuwait, or the rest of the Gulf in general. Author Mehran Kokherdi [Author of "History of South Fars"] states that the term Persians is used to refer to all groups with original Parsi roots, including the inhabitants of villages scattered across Persia who still speak their ancient Parsi language. However, the term has also come to describe the populations of major cities (e.g. Tehran, Shiraz, Isfahan) more broadly, who consist of a blend of various ethnic groups, all unified by their use of Modern Persian—a language that incorporates elements from Arabic, Turkish, French, Russian, Mongolian, and Parsi. Based on their shared language, the people of Iran generally identify them as Persians. This leads many scholars to believe that the term "Iranian" is more encompassing and inclusive of these various ethnic groups (Iranic people, and ethnic groups in Iran).

== Demographics ==
There are an estimated 150 to 200 million native speakers of Iranian languages, the six major groups of Persians, Lurs, Kurds, Tajiks, Baloch, and Pashtuns accounting for about 90% of this number. Currently, most of these Iranian peoples live in Iran, Afghanistan, the Caucasus (mainly Ossetia, other parts of Georgia, Dagestan, and Azerbaijan), Iraqi Kurdistan and Kurdish majority populated areas of Turkey, Iran and Syria, Tajikistan, Pakistan and Uzbekistan. There are also Iranian peoples living in Eastern Arabia such as northern Oman, Bahrain, and Kuwait.

Due to recent migrations, there are also large communities of speakers of Iranian languages in Europe and the Americas.

List of Iranian peoples with the respective groups' core areas of settlements and their estimated sizes
| Ethnicity | Origins (Note: Western and Eastern Iranics are determined based on their proximity to Greater Iran and their linguistic and cultural characteristics. Western Iranic peoples, such as Achomi Persians, Fars, Kurds, Lors, and Talysh, historically inhabited regions closer to the Iranian Plateau and speak languages belonging to the Southwestern and Northwestern branches of the Iranic family. Eastern Iranic peoples, including Pashtuns, Baloch, Sogdians, and others, traditionally lived in areas extending toward Central and South Asia, speaking languages that evolved from the Eastern branch of Old Iranian. This division reflects both geographic settlement patterns and deep linguistic evolution over millennia.) | Language | Region | Population |
|---|---|---|---|---|
| Achumis (Irahistanis/Laristanis/Garmsiris/Khodmoonis) | Western Iranic, Persian tribe (Ira and Utians) | Achomi/Lari/Khodmooni, a Branch of Southwestern, Middle Iranian, Middle Persian (Parsig), in addition to Farsi (Iran), and Arabic (Gulf) | Primarily Southwestern Iran (Irahistan, Larestan region). Notable presence in Shiraz and GCC Arab Gulf states Bahrain, Kuwait, Qatar, UAE, Oman. | 0.5–1,000,000 |
| Baluchs | Western Iranic, possibly Medes / Parthians (?) | Balochi | Historial Homeland: Iran & Pakistan (Balochistan region) Notable presence in: Afghanistan, Turkmenistan, UAE, Bahrain, Kuwait, Oman. | 20–22,000,000 |
| Bashkardis | Western Iranic, Persians | Bashkardi language, a dialect of the neighboring Garmsiri (Bandari) language. A branch of Old Persian. | Iran | ? |
| Basseri | Western Iranic, Persian tribe (Pasargadean) | Basseri | Southwestern Iran, Fars Province, Shiraz | 72,000 |
| Dehwar | ? | Farsi with a dialect known as Dehwari | Iran & Pakistan (Balochistan region) | ? |
| Farsiwan | ? | Farsi with a Kabuli, Khorasani dialect | Afghanistan | ? |
| Feyli Kurds / Feyli Lurs (Note: There is a conflict on their classification) | Western Iranic, possibly Medes / Parthians | Feyli or Ilami | Iran, Iraq | 1,500,000 |
| Gilakis, Mazanderanis And Semnani people | Western Iranic, Possibly Medes / Parthians | Gilaki, Mazandrani, Branches of Northwestern Median/Parthian... | Northwestern Iran | 5–10,000,000 |
| Iranian Azeris: Talysh; Tats | Western Iranic, possibly Medes / Parthians | Old Azeri (extinct), Talyshi, Tati | Azerbaijan, Iran | 1.5,000,000 |
| Kumzari | ? | Kumzari language | Oman (Musandam) | 5,500 ~ |
| Kurds, Yazidis, Shabaks | Western Iranic, Medes | Kurdish, Northwestern: Kurmanji; Sorani; Southern Kurdish; Laki | Historical Homeland: Iran, Iraq, Turkey, Syria (Kurdistan region) Notable presence in: Armenia, Azerbaijan, Kuwait, and United Kingdom. | 30–40,000,000 |
| Lurs: Bakhtiaris; Mamasanis; Etc... | Western Iranic, Ellamites, Kassites, Gautians, and possibly Persians | Luri, a branch of Southwestern Middle Persian with close kinship to New Persian | Historical Homeland: Iran, Lorestan region. Notable presence in: Kuwait, Oman, Bahrain (Bakhtiaris), andUnited Kingdom. | 6,000,000 |
| Ossetians: Digor; Iron; Jasz | Eastern Iranic, Iazyges tribe of the Sarmatians, an Alanic sub-tribe, which split off from Scythians. | Ossetian language | Georgia (South Ossetia), Russia (North Ossetia), Hungary | 700,000 |
| Pamiris: Sariqoli; Shughni; Wakhi; Oroshori; Yidgha-Munji | Eastern Iranic, Saka (Scythian), Tocharian, Dardic tribes, as well as pre-Indo-European groups. | Pamir languages | Tajikistan, Afghanistan, China (Xinjiang), Pakistan | 300,000–350,000 |
| Pashtuns: Sarbani (Durrani or Abdali, Yusufzai); Bettani (Ghilji and Lodi); Karlani | Eastern Iranic, Various groups | Pashto | Afghanistan, Pakistan | 60-70,000,000 |
| Persian tribes: Maraphii; Maspii; Pasargadae | | Persian language | Iran | 51,940,000 |
| Sistanis | ? | Sistani | northern parts of Sistan and Balouchistan province Iran | ? |
| Tajiks | Eastern Iranic, Sogdians and the Bactrians. | Farsi aka New Persian (Dari, & Tajiki) | Afghanistan, Tajikistan | 8-15,000,000 (2024) |
| Yaghnobi | Eastern Iranic, Sogdian | Yaghnobi language, a descendant of Eastern Iranic Sogdian language | Uzbekistan and Tajikistan (Zerafshan region) | 25,000 |
| Zazas | proposed Deylaman | Zaza (Southern Zaza and Northern Zaza | Turkey | 2.000.000-3.000.000 |
| Zoroastrian groups in South Asia: Parsi; Irani | Western Iranic? Persian tribes? | Avestan (liturgical language), Zoroastrian Dari (Iranis) | India, Pakistan | 202,604 ~ |

== Culture ==
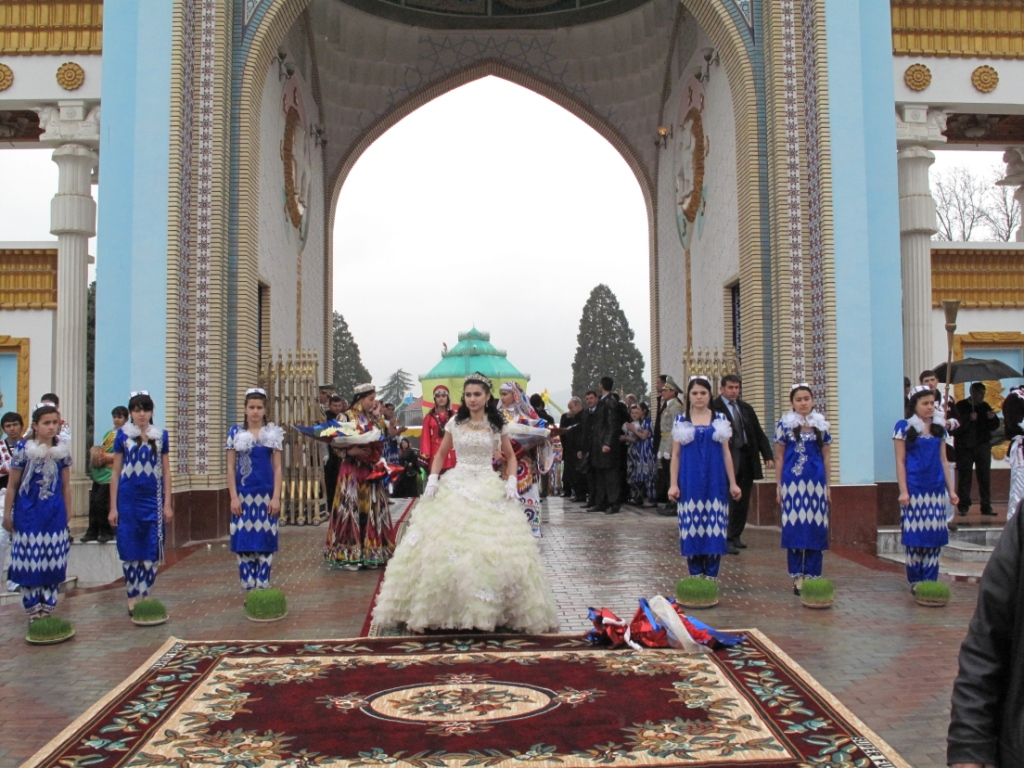
Nowruz, an ancient Iranian annual festival that is still widely celebrated throughout the Iranian Plateau and beyond, in Dushanbe, Tajikistan.

Iranian culture is today considered to be centered in what is called the Iranian Plateau, and has its origins tracing back to the Andronovo culture of the late Bronze Age, which is associated with other cultures of the Eurasian Steppe. It was, however, later developed distinguishably from its earlier generations in the Steppe, where a large number of Iranian-speaking peoples (i.e., the Scythians) continued to participate, resulting in a differentiation that is displayed in Iranian mythology as the contrast between Iran and Turan.

Like other Indo-Europeans, the early Iranians practiced ritual sacrifice, had a social hierarchy consisting of warriors, clerics, and farmers, and recounted their deeds through poetic hymns and sagas. Various common traits can be discerned among the Iranian peoples. For instance, the social event of Nowruz is an ancient Iranian festival that is still celebrated by nearly all of the Iranian peoples. However, due to their different environmental adaptations through migration, the Iranian peoples embrace some degrees of diversity in dialect, social system, and other aspects of culture.

With numerous artistic, scientific, architectural, and philosophical achievements and numerous kingdoms and empires that bridged much of the civilized world in antiquity, the Iranian peoples were often in close contact with people from various western and eastern parts of the world.

=== Religion ===
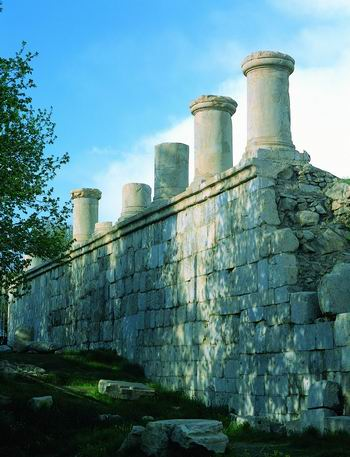
The ruins at Kangavar, Iran, presumed to belong to a temple dedicated to the ancient goddess Anahita.

The early Iranian peoples practiced the ancient Iranian religion, which, like that of other Indo-European peoples, embraced various male and female deities. Fire was regarded as an important and highly sacred element, and also a deity. In ancient Iran, fire was kept with great care in fire temples. Various annual festivals that were mainly related to agriculture and herding were celebrated, the most important of which was the New Year (Nowruz), which is still widely celebrated. Zoroastrianism, a form of the ancient Iranian religion that is still practiced by some communities, was later developed and spread to nearly all of the Iranian peoples living in the Iranian Plateau. Other religions that had their origins in the Iranian world were Mithraism, Manichaeism, and Mazdakism, among others. The various religions of the Iranian peoples are believed by some scholars to have been significant early philosophical influences on Christianity and Judaism.

Nowadays, most Iranian people follow Islam (Sunnism, followed by Shi'ism), with minorities following Christianity, Judaism, Mandaeism, Iranian religions and various levels of irreligion.

=== Cultural assimilation ===
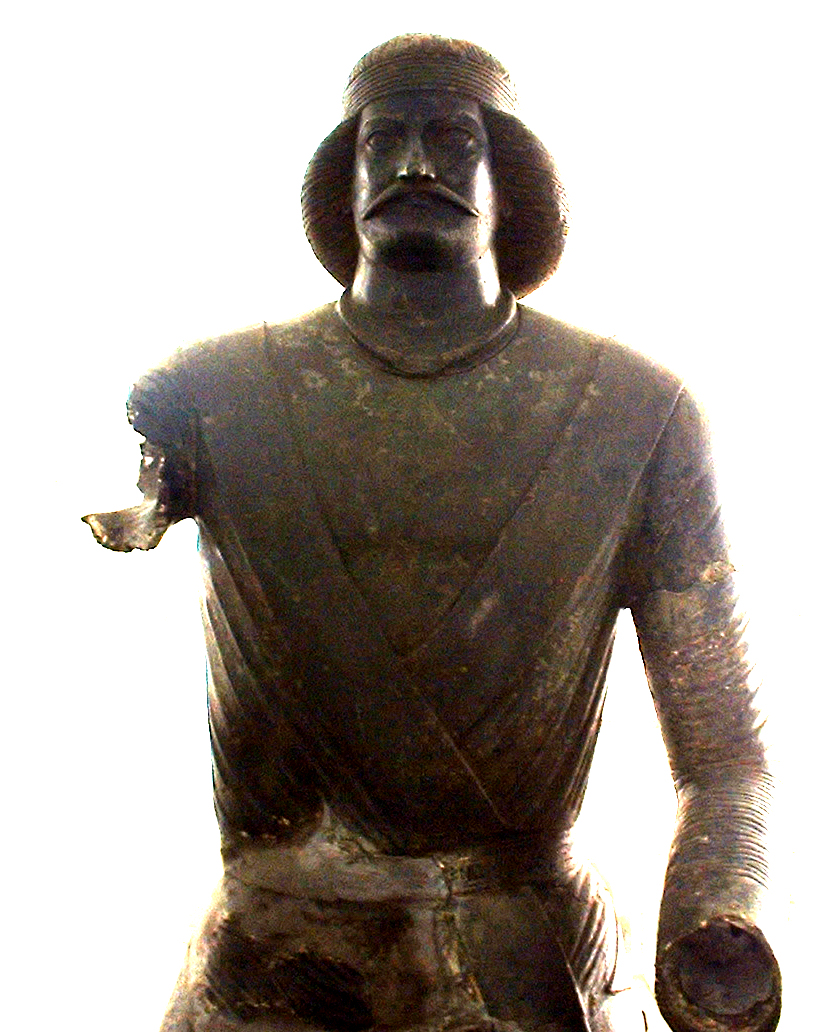
Bronze Statue of a Parthian nobleman, National Museum of Iran

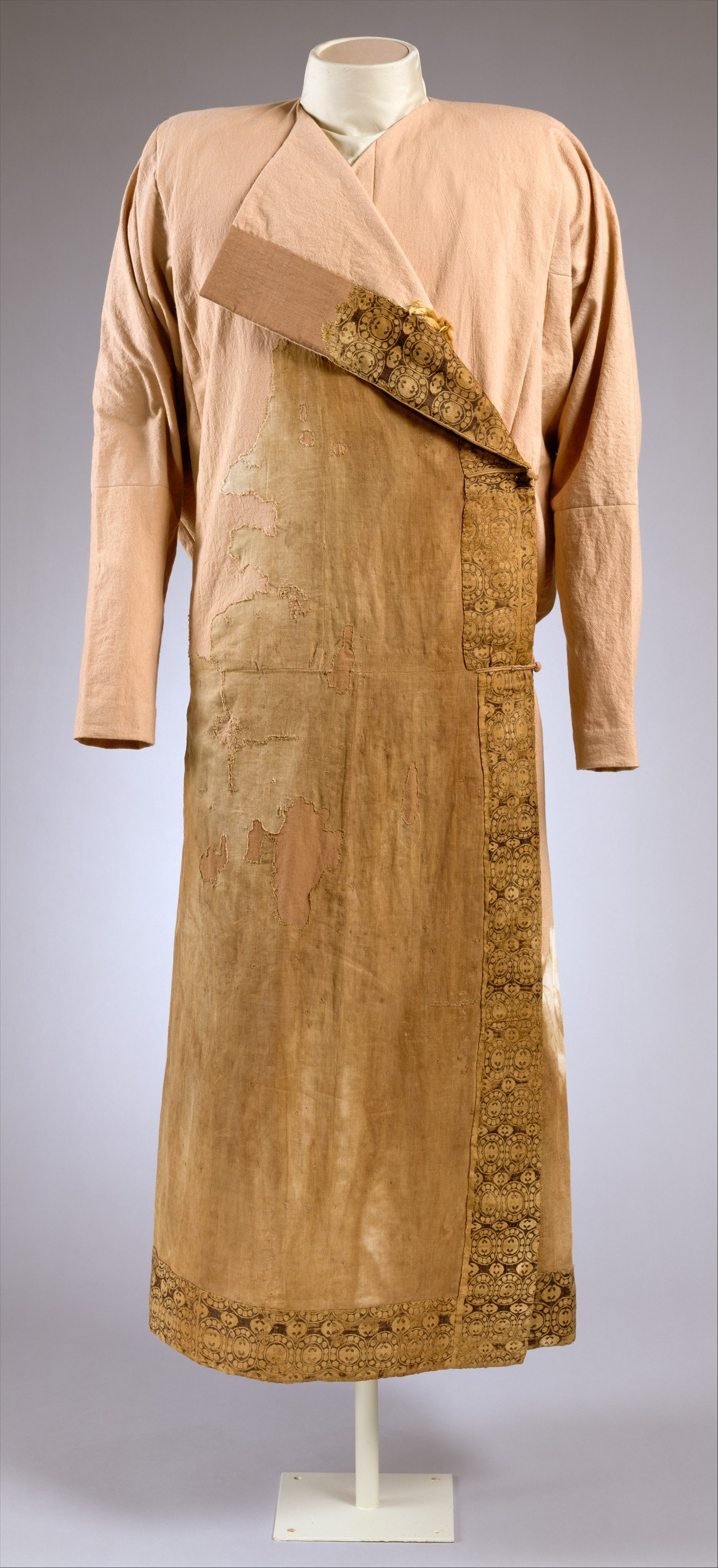
A caftan worn by a Sogdian horseman, 8th–10th century

Iranian languages were and, to a lesser extent, still are spoken in a wide area comprising regions around the Black Sea, the Caucasus, Central Asia, Russia and the northwest of China. This population was linguistically assimilated by smaller but dominant Turkic-speaking groups, while the sedentary population eventually adopted the Persian language, which began to spread within the region since the time of the Sasanian Empire. The language-shift from Middle Iranian to Turkic and New Persian was predominantly the result of an "elite dominance" process. Moreover, various Turkic-speaking ethnic groups of the Iranian Plateau are often conversant also in an Iranian language and embrace Iranian culture to the extent that the term Turko-Iranian would be applied. A number of Iranian peoples were also intermixed with the Slavs, and many were subjected to Slavicisation.

The following either partially descend from or are sometimes regarded as descendants of the Iranian peoples.

- Turkic-speakers:
  - Azerbaijanis: In spite of being native speakers of a Turkic language (Azerbaijani Turkic), they are believed to be primarily descended from the earlier Iranian-speakers of the region. They are possibly related to the ancient Iranian tribe of the Medes, aside from the rise of the subsequent Persian and Turkic elements (changing of the native Iranian language) within their area of settlement, which, prior to the spread of Turkic, was Iranian-speaking. Thus, due to their historical, genetic and cultural ties to the Iranians, the Azerbaijanis are often associated with the Iranian peoples. Genetic studies observed that they are also genetically related to the Iranian peoples.
  - Turkmens: Genetic studies show that the Turkmens are characterized by the presence of local Iranian mtDNA lineages, similar to the eastern Iranian populations, but modest female Mongoloid mtDNA components were observed in Turkmen populations with the frequencies of about 20%.
  - Uzbeks: The unique grammatical and phonetical features of the Uzbek language, as well as elements within the modern Uzbek culture, reflect the older Iranian roots of the Uzbek people. According to recent genetic genealogy testing from a University of Oxford study, the genetic admixture of the Uzbeks clusters somewhere between the Iranian peoples and the Mongols. Prior to the Russian conquest of Central Asia, the local ancestors of the Turkic-speaking Uzbeks and the Persian-speaking Tajiks, both living in Central Asia, were referred to as Sarts, while Uzbek and Turk were the names given to the nomadic and semi-nomadic populations of the area. Still, as of today, modern Uzbeks and Tajiks are known to their Turkic neighbors, the Kazakhs and the Kyrgyz, as Sarts. Some Uzbek scholars also favor the Iranian origin theory. However, another study, conducted in 2009, claims that Uzbeks and Central Asian Turkic peoples cluster genetically and are far from Iranian groups.
  - Uyghurs: Contemporary scholars consider modern Uyghurs to be the descendants of, apart from the ancient Uyghurs, the Iranian Saka (Scythian) tribes and other Indo-European peoples who inhabited the Tarim Basin before the arrival of the Turkic tribes.
- Persian-speakers:
  - The Hazaras are a Persian-speaking ethnic group native to, and primarily residing in, the mountainous region of Hazarajat, in central Afghanistan. Although the origins of the Hazara people have not been fully reconstructed, genetic analysis of the Hazara indicate partial Mongol ancestry. Mongol and Turkic invaders (Turco-Mongols) mixed with the local indigenous Turkic and Iranian populations; for example, Qara'unas settled in what is now Afghanistan and mixed with the local populations. A second wave of mostly Chagatai Turco-Mongols came from Central Asia, associated with the Ilkhanate and the Timurids, all of whom settled in Hazarajat and mixed with the local populations. Phenotype can vary, with some noting that certain Hazaras may resemble peoples native to the Iranian plateau.
- Slavic-speakers:
  - Croats and Serbs: Some scholars suggest that the Slavic-speaking Serbs and Croats are descended from the ancient Sarmatians, an ancient Iranian people who once settled in most of southern European Russia and the eastern Balkans, and that their ethnonyms are of Iranian origin. It is proposed that the Sarmatian Serboi and alleged Horoathos tribes were assimilated with the numerically superior Slavs, passing on their name. Iranian-speaking peoples did inhabit parts of the Balkans in late classical times, and would have been encountered by the Slavs. An archaeogenetic IBD study found that the Slavs make a specific and recognisable genetic cluster which "was formed by admixture of a Baltic-related group with East Germanic people and Sarmatians or Scythians". Although previous direct linguistic, historical, or archaeological proof for such a theory is lacking. (Note: See also: Origin hypotheses of the Serbs and Origin hypotheses of the Croats)
- Swahili-speakers:
  - Shirazis: The Shirazi are a sub-group of the Swahili people living on the Swahili coast of East Africa, especially on the islands of Zanzibar, Pemba, and Comoros. Local traditions about their origin claim they are descended from merchant princes from Shiraz in Iran who settled along the Swahili coast.
- Indo-Aryan speakers:
  - Sindhis: About 40% of Pakistan's Baloch population lives in Sindh, many of whom speak Sindhi. It is believed that the first Baloch came to Sindh during the Little Ice Age, with further waves of migration during the 18th century. The Talpur Dynasty was an ethnic Baloch dynasty that ruled much of Sindh and parts of Balochistan during the British colonial period. The industrialisation of Karachi under direct British rule in Sindh drew further migrants from Balochistan, including Baloch fleeing Qajar and Pahlavi Iran and Afro-Baloch Makranis. The Baloch in Sindh are known as the Baruch (ٻروچ).

== Genetics ==
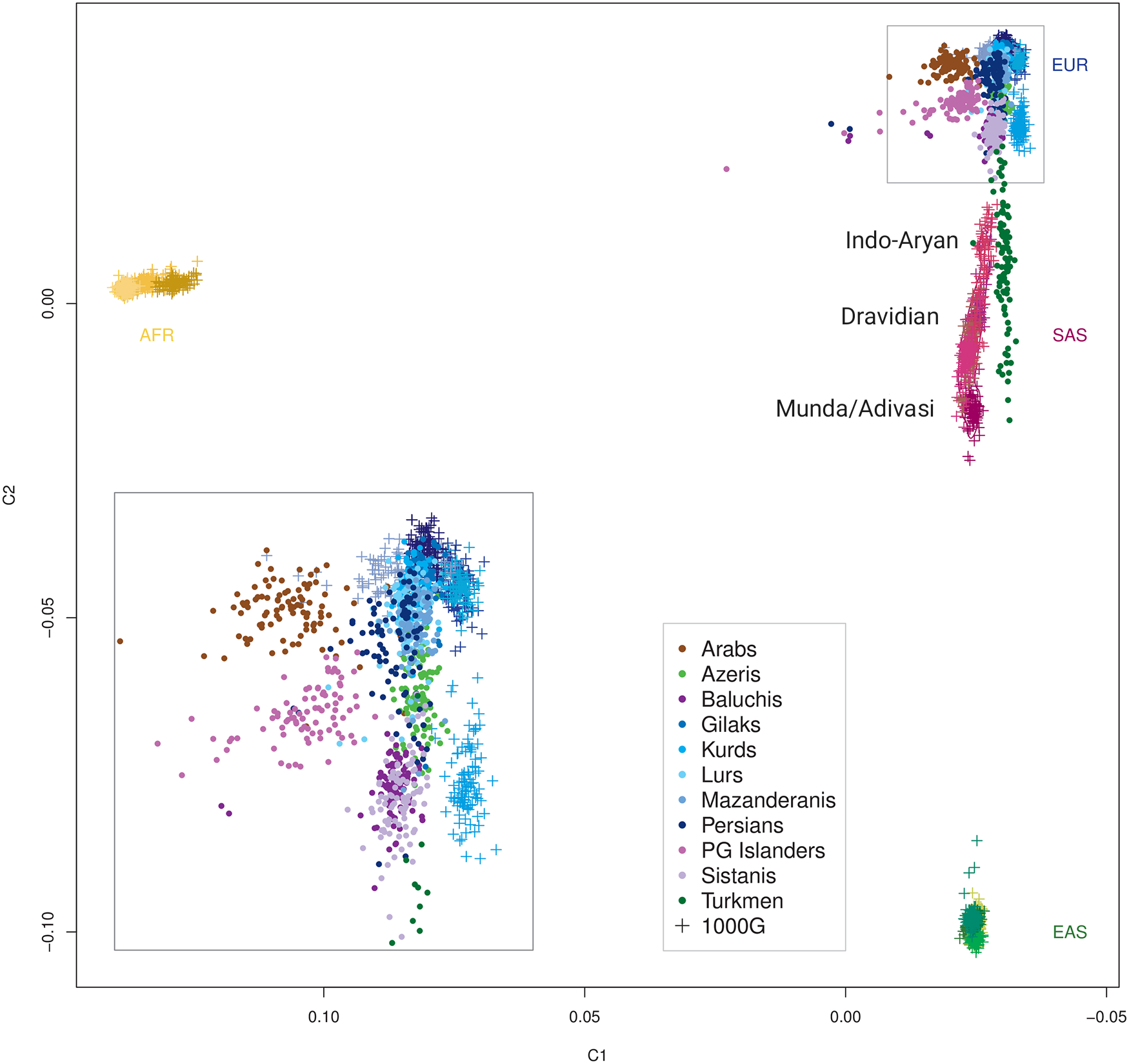
Population genomic PCA, showing the CIC (Central Iranian cluster) among other worldwide samples.

Recent population genomic studies found that the genetic structure of Iranian peoples formed already about 5,000 years ago and show high continuity since then, suggesting that they were largely unaffected by migration events from outside groups. Genetically speaking, Iranian peoples generally cluster closely with European and other Middle Eastern peoples. Analyzed samples of Iranian Persians, Kurds, Azeris, Lurs, Mazanderanis, Gilaks and Arabs cluster tightly together, forming a single cluster known as the CIC (Central Iranian cluster). Compared with worldwide populations, Iranians (CIC) cluster in the center of the wider West-Eurasian cluster, close to Europeans, Middle Easterners, and South-Central Asians. Iranian Arabs and Azeris genetically overlap with Iranian peoples. The genetic substructure of Iranians is low and homogeneous, compared with other "1000G" populations. Europeans, and certain South Asians (specifically the Parsi minority) showed the highest affinity with Iranians, while Sub-Saharan Africans and East Asians showed the highest differentiation with Iranians.

The BMAC population largely derived from preceding local Copper Age peoples who were in turn related to Neolithic farmers from the Iranian plateau and to a lesser extent early Anatolian farmers, as well as West Siberian hunter-gatherers. The samples extracted from the BMAC sites did not have derived any part of their ancestry from the Yamnaya people, who are associated with Proto-Indo-Europeans, although some peripheral samples did already carry significant Yamnaya-like Western Steppe Herders ancestry, inline with the southwards expansion of Western Steppe Herders from the Sintashta and Andronovo cultures towards Southern Central Asia at c. 2100 BCE.

The Yaz I culture of Margiana, Bactria and Sogdia was characterised by a combination of BMAC and Andronovo ancestries. Likewise, a 2022 study also shows that the ancestry of modern Tajiks and Yaghnobis largely formed during the early Iron Age by a mixture between these two groups.

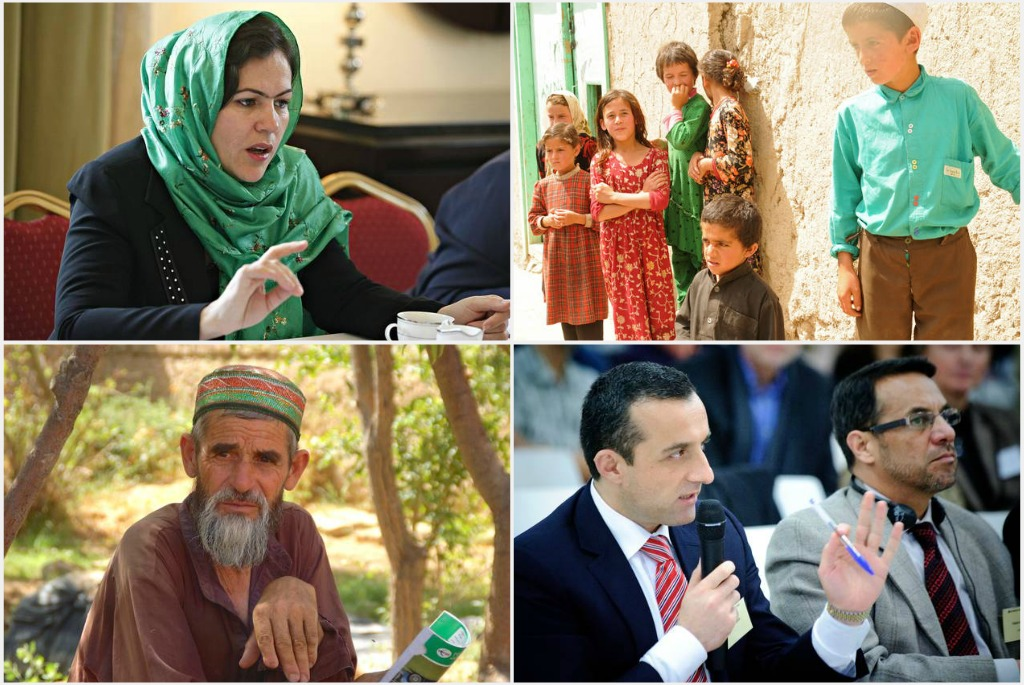
Tajik people from Afghanistan

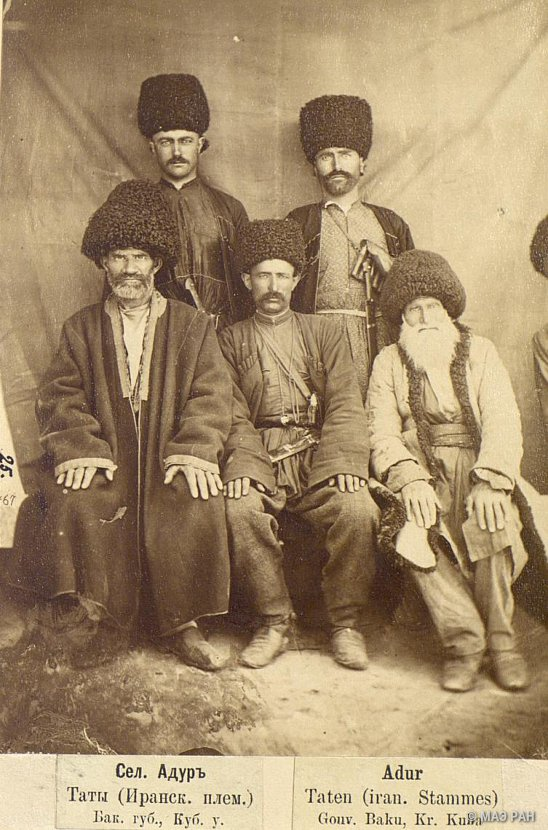
Tat men from the village of Adur in the Kuba Uyezd of the Baku Governorate of the Russian Empire

=== Paternal haplogroups ===
Regueiro et al (2006) and Grugni et al (2012) have performed large-scale sampling of Y chromosome haplogroups of different ethnic groups within Iran. They found that the most common paternal haplogroups were:

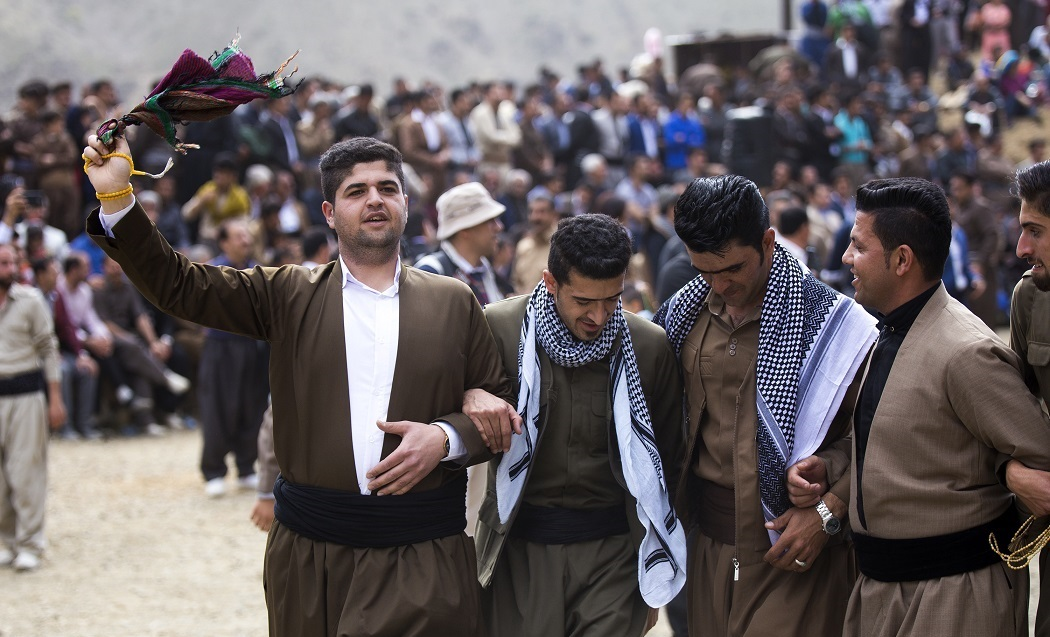
Kurdish people celebrating Nowruz, Tangi Sar village.

- J1-M267; commonly found among Semitic-speaking people, was rarely over 10% in Iranian groups.
- J2-M172: is the most common Hg in Iran (~23%); almost exclusively represented by J2a-M410 subclade (93%), the other major sub-clade being J2b-M12. Apart from Iranians, J2 is common in northern Arabs, Mediterranean and Balkan peoples (Croats, Serbs, Greeks, Bosniaks, Albanians, Italians, Macedonians, Bulgarians, Turks), in the Caucasus (Armenians, Georgians, Chechens, Ingush, northeastern Turkey, north/northwestern Iran, Kurds, Persians); whilst its frequency drops suddenly beyond Afghanistan, Pakistan and northern India. In Europe, J2a is more common in southern Greece and southern Italy; whilst J2b (J2-M12) is more common in Thessaly, Macedonia and central – northern Italy. Thus J2a and its subgroups within it have a wide distribution from Italy to India, whilst J2b is mostly confined to the Balkans and Italy, being rare even in Turkey. Whilst closely linked with Anatolia and the Levant; and putative agricultural expansions, the distribution of the various sub-clades of J2 likely represents a number of migrational histories which require further elucidation.
- R1a-M198: is common in Iran, more so in the east and south rather than the west and north; suggesting a migration toward the south to India then a secondary westward spread across Iran. Whilst the Grongi and Regueiro studies did not define exactly which sub-clades Iranian R1a haplogrouops belong to, private genealogy tests suggest that they virtually all belong to "Eurasian" R1a-Z93. Indeed, population studies of neighbouring Indian groups found that they all were in R1a-Z93. This implies that R1a in Iran did not descend from "European" R1a, or vice versa. Rather, both groups are collateral, brother branches which descend from a parental group hypothesized to have initially lived somewhere between central Asia and Eastern Europe.
- R1b – M269: is widespread from Ireland to Iran, and is common in highland West Asian populations such as Armenians, Turks and Iranians – with an average frequency of 8.5%. Iranian R1b belongs to the L-23 subclade, which is an older than the derivative subclade (R1b-M412) which is most common in western Europe.
- Haplogroup G and subclades: most concentrated in the Caucasus, it is present in 10% of Iranians.
- Haplogroup E and various subclades are frequently found among Middle Easterners, Europeans, northern and eastern African populations. They are present in less than 10% of Iranians.

Two large – scale papers by Haber (2012) and Di Cristofaro (2013) analyzed populations from Afghanistan, where several Iranian-speaking groups are native. They found that different groups (e.g. Baluch, Hazara, Pashtun) were quite diverse, yet overall:

- R1a (subclade not further analyzed) was the predominant haplogroup, especially amongst Pashtuns, the Baloch and Tajiks.
- The presence of "East-Eurasian" haplogroup C3, especially in Hazaras (33–40%), in part linked to Mongol expansions into the region.
- The presence of haplogroup J2, like in Iran, of 5–20%.
- A relative paucity of "Indian" haplogroup H (< 10%).

A 2012 study by Grugni et al. analyzed the haplogroups of 15 different ethnic groups from Iran. They found that about 31.4% belong to J, 29.1% belong to R, 11.8% belong to G, and 9.2% belong to E. They found that Iranian ethnic groups display high haplogroup diversity, compared to other Middle Easterners. The authors concluded that the Iranian gene pool has been an important source for the Middle Eastern and Eurasian Y chromosome diversity, and the results suggest that there was already rather high Y chromosome diversity during the Neolithic period, placing Iranian populations in between Europeans, Middle Easterners and South Asians.

A 2024 study by Vallini et al. stated that ancient and modern populations in the Iranian plateau have a similar genetic component to the Ancient West Eurasian lineage which stayed in the 'population hub' (WEC2). But they also display some ancestry from Basal Eurasians and Ancient East Eurasians via contact events starting in the Paleolithic.

== See also ==
- List of ancient Iranian peoples
- List of geographic names of Iranian origin
- Pan-Iranism
