= Shiraz rug =

Type of Persian rug

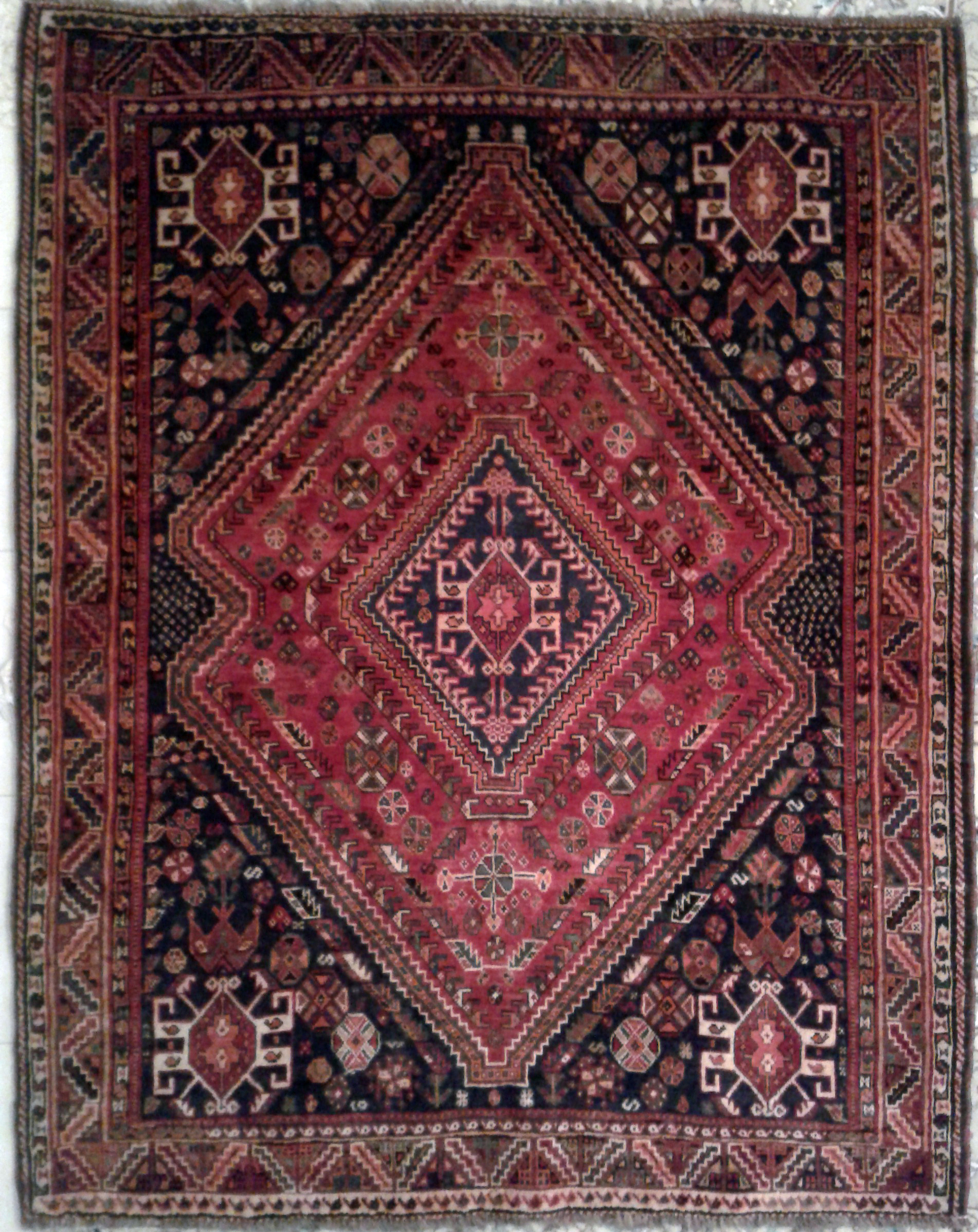
- A rug produced by the Basseri tribe
- Type: Carpeting
- Material: Wool, cotton and silk
- Production method: Knotting
- Production process: Handicraft
- Place of origin: Fars province, Iran

Traditional skills of carpet weaving in Fars
- UNESCO Intangible Cultural Heritage
- Country: Iran
- Reference: 00382
- Region: Asia and the Pacific

Inscription history
- Inscription: 2010 (4th session)
- List: Representative

A Shiraz carpet (Persian: قالی شیراز) is a type of Persian rug made in the villages around the city of Shiraz, in the Iranian province of Fars.

Designs tend to come from settled tribal weavers so they mimic Qashqai, Khamseh (Basseri and Khamseh Arabs), Afshar, Abadeh and Luri designs. Since the weavers are using fixed looms the rugs tend to be larger and often coarser than their tribal counterparts. Shiraz rugs are not often very finely knotted, with both Qashqai and Abadeh both having a finer knot. Shiraz utilizes the Persian (asymmetrical) knot.

Some pieces feature Cyrus' white horse. The Shiraz carpet is the only rug to depict nightingales, which are shown as angular-shaped birds. These birds are said to symbolise contentment and happiness.

The rugs of the Basseri tribe, one of the Persian tribes of the Fars province, are famous for their colorful designs. Orange is the specific color of Basseri rugs.
