= Basseri =

Persian nomadic tribe

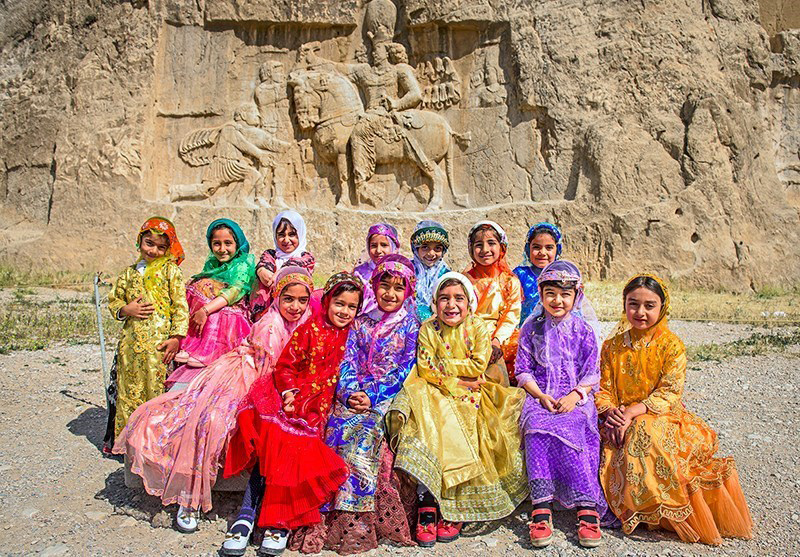
- Basseri kids in Naqsh-e Rostam

Total population
- 72,000

Regions with significant populations
- Fars province

Languages
- Basseri dialect

Religion
- Shia Islam (Twelver)

Related ethnic groups
- Other Persians

The Basseri (Persian: باسری or باصری) are a Persian nomadic and pastoral tribe of the Fars province in Iran. Their migratory area is around Shiraz. They are one of the five tribes of the larger Khamseh confederation. The "tent" is the basic unit of social organization among the Basseri. All tents have a recognized head that deals with the formal officers of the tribe, villagers, and other strangers. The Basseri economy stems mainly from sheep and goats.

The Basseri name originates from the ancient Persian name Pasari, which was associated with one of the five original families of early Persia. Following the Arab conquest, the name underwent a linguistic change: because the Arabic alphabet does not contain the letter P, Pasari was transformed into Basseri.

One of the notable leaders of this lineage was Akhamanesh Pasari, also known as Achmaied Pasari. A distinguished member of the Pasari/Basseri tribe was Cyrus, later known as Cyrus the Great. With the support of the Basseri tribe, he rose to power and named his dynasty after the tribe’s leader . The "tent" is the basic unit of social organization among the Basseri. All tents have a recognized head that deals with the formal officers of the tribe, villagers, and other strangers. The Basseri economy stems mainly from sheep and goats.

Basseries' map in Fars

== Origin ==
Basseries are Persians. Their origin is the "Pasargadean" tribe. The Pasargadean tribe was the biggest tribe of Persia and the tribe who helped Cyrus The Great constitute the Achaemenid Empire. They were named "Karian" tribe in Sasanian Empire period. They were the rulers of some parts of south Persia and the Karyan city of Persia because they helped Ardashir I constitute the Sasanian empire.

After the Muslim conquest of Persia they were under rule of Arabic Tribes of South Persia, who migrated to Persia after its conquest, till the constitution of the Zand dynasty by Karim Khan. In Pahlavi dynasty period they were settled by the government in 1930 and again started to decamp in 1941. After the Land Reformations of Iran, they were settled in the cities and the villages of Fars province; but after some years, they again started decamping. After the Islamic Revolution of Iran because of the problems of being nomad including inaccessibility to modern facilities (hospitals, schools, etc.), successive droughts, destruction of the migration paths they again went to the cities and the villages of the province for living.

== Religion ==
Basseries are Shia Muslims, They became Sunni Muslims after the Arabs invaded Iran in the 7th century CE. They were force converted to Shi'ism following the Safavid invasion in the 16th century CE. Previously, Basseries were Zoroastrians like the majority of Persians, before the arrival of Islam in the region.

== Language ==
The Basseri speak Basseri dialect, a dialect of Persian with many Old Persian words not found in modern Persian. The majority know only the Basseri dialect, but some know English too. It is most similar to the Persian spoken in urban Shiraz.

Some words in Basseri dialect are similar to English words:

Basseri	English	standard Persian	st. Persian transcription
Var	Wear	پوشیدن	Pušidan
Jong	Young	جوان	Javān
Babu	Baby	نوزاد	Nowzād
Kap	Cap	کلاه	Kolāh
Sol	Soil	خاک	Xāk

== Region ==
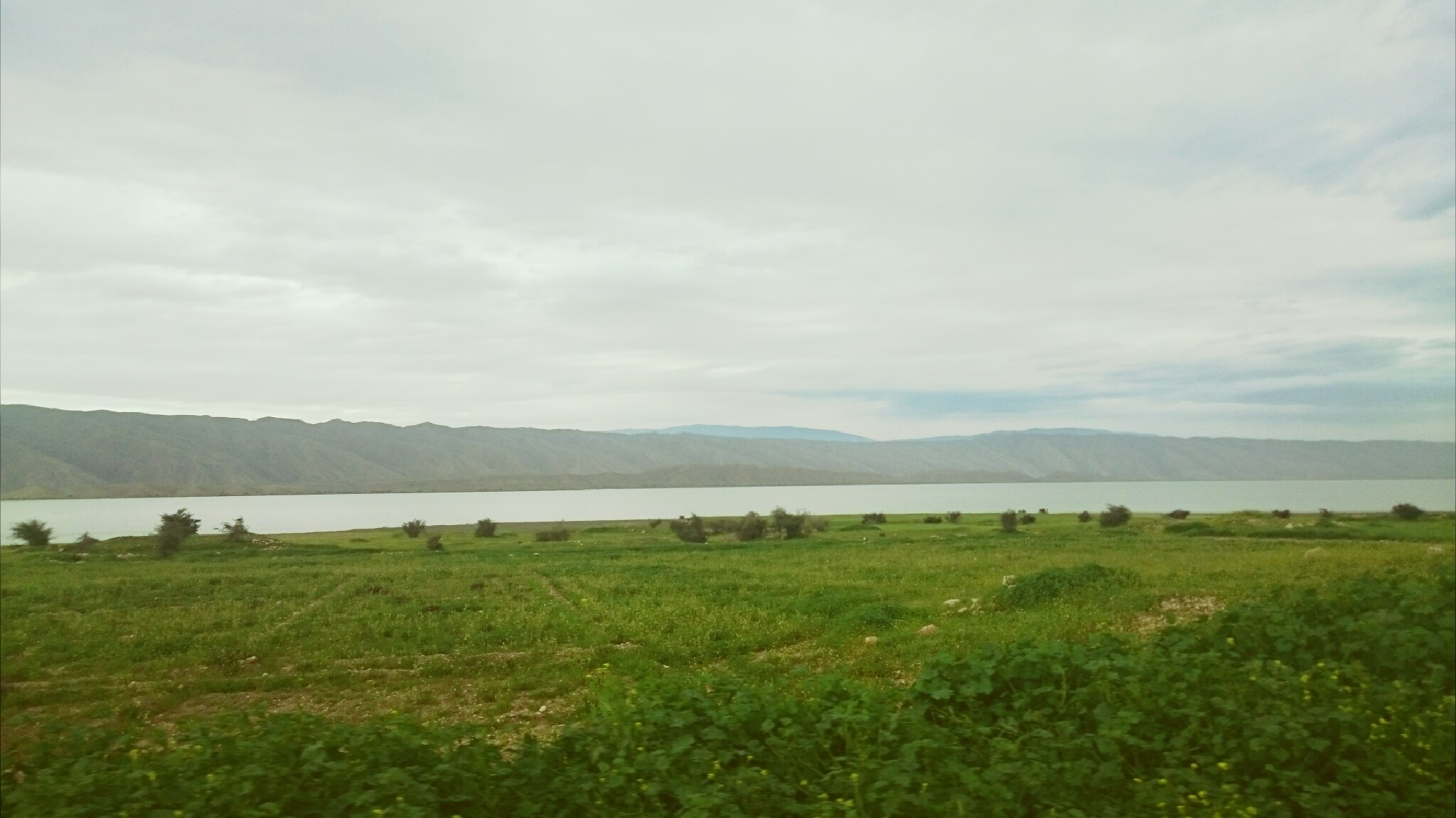
Basseri summerland in Harm, Larestan and also a view of Harm Lake

The Basseri are residents of Fars province, which is noted for its wide range of ethnic groups. The mixing of groups means that most tribes are better defined by political criteria. The traditional lands of the Basseri constitute a strip about 300 mi (480 km) long and 20–50 mi (32–80 km) wide. The land runs from the Kūh-e Būl mountain to the hills west of the city of Lar.

The Basseri habitat was originally Fars district; but big Basseri Communities are also in Khuzestan, Isfahan, Razavi Khorasan, Semnan and Tehran.

Neighboring tribes include the Nafar tribe and the oppositional Qashqai confederacy.

=== Migration ===
The winter land of the Basseri is in Jahrom, Evaz and north of Larestan County. They stay in Marvdasht, Pasargad, and Eqlid in summers.

Many Basseri were forced to settle down and cease their nomadic life in the 1930s by the policies of Reza Shah. Thus, much of the population of the villages and towns, such as Shiraz, trace their ancestry to the Basseri.

== Tribe hierarchy ==
The chief of the Basseri tribe rules through coercive authority. The main functions of the chief are: to allocate pastures and coordinate the migration of the tribes, settle disputes that are brought to him, and represent the tribe or any of its members in politically important dealings with sedentary authorities. Most matters of law are governed by custom and compromise in the Basseri tribe and is regulated by diffuse sanctions. However the chief will serve as a mediator for cases that can not be solved through tradition because of the matters of the case. The chief is not bound by precedent or custom in his decision, and his decision will be based on what he feels is "best for the tribe".

The Darbar consist of Basseri tribe members who are closest with the chief and always migrate with him. Within the Darbar there is a personal valet, master of the stores, a groom for the chief's riding horse, a scribe, and a hunting/drinking companion.

Historically, the Basseri were part of the Khamseh tribal confederacy, but its importance both politically and socially has waned in modern times.

== Textile ==
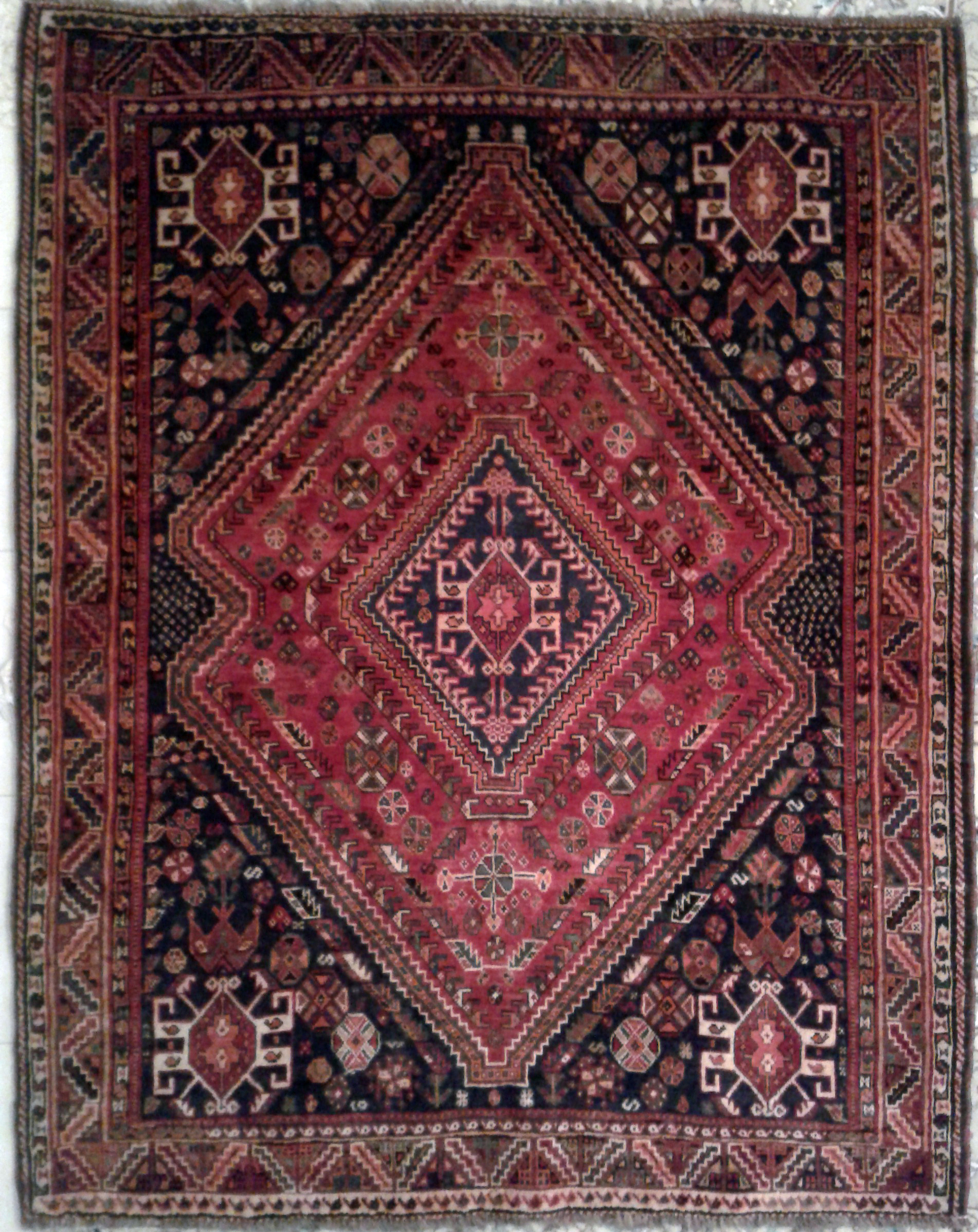
A rug by the Basseri the tribe

All packing tools and rugs are locally made, woven by the women. Women's clothes are largely sewn from bought material, while male clothing is bought finished.

Basseri tribe rugs (see also Shiraz rug) are asymmetrically knotted, brighter in colours, with more open space and smaller ornaments and figure with orange as the specific color. The women of the tribe usually make the rugs.

== Clans ==
The Basseri has two great sections called Waysi (Persian: ویسی) and Ali-mirzai (Persian: علی میرزایی). Each section has several clans. Some of the clans are not originally from the Basseri, but are emigrants from other tribes or cities.

The Basseri clans include:

Waysi
- Jowchin
- Kolombey
- Labmusa
- Abdoli
- Farhadi
- Ile Khas

Ali-mirzai
- Salehi
- Karami
- Ali-Ghanbari
- Zohrabi
- Ghughi
- Mir

Emigrants
- Ali-Shahgholi
- Algholi (Ahle Gholi)
- Hanai
- Korejey
- Sarvestani
- Tarbor
- Charbonicheh

== See also ==
- Mohammad khan Zarghami
- Bakhtiari people
- Qashqai people

== Sources ==
- Amanolahi, Sekandar (2003). "Socio-Political Changes Among the Basseri of South Iran". Iran and the Caucasus. 7 (1): 261–277. doi:10.1163/157338403X00141.
- Fredrik Barth (1964). Nomads of South Persia: the Basseri tribe of the Khamseh Confederacy. (archive.org)
- Barth, Frederik (2013). Nomads of South Persia – The Basseri Tribe of the Khamseh Confederacy. Read Books Limited. ISBN 978-1-4465-4578-2.
- Ehsan Yousefi, nomads of Persia: The Basseri tribe; 2014; Shiraz
