= Khamseh (disambiguation) =

The Khamseh are a tribal confederation in southwestern Iran.

Khamseh may also refer to:

- Khamsa of Nizami (British Library, Or. 12208), illustrated manuscript of the 12th century Persian poem by the poet Nizami Ganjavi
- Khamseh, multiple possible versions of the poem by the 12th-century poet Nizami Ganjavi
- Khamseh, a small province unrelated to the Khamseh confederation, which lies in northwestern Iran, between Kazvin and Tabriz. Its regional capital is Zanjan, Iran.
- Khamseh, two distinctive types of weaving: One by the Khamseh confederation, and the mainly Kurdish village rugs woven in the province of Khamseh around Zenjan, sometimes referred to as Khamseh Kurdi
