= Badres =

Ancient Greek comic poet

Badres (Ancient Greek: Βάδρης) or Bares (Ancient Greek: Βάρης) was a man of ancient Persia, of the tribe of the Pasargadae, who lived in the 6th century BCE and was aligned with the Achaemenid Empire.

He was appointed to the command of the naval portion of the force which Aryandes, Achaemenid satrap of ancient Egypt, sent against the city of Barca, on the pretext of avenging the murder of Arcesilaus III of Cyrene. The general Amasis was dispatched alongside Badres, to command the land force.

Around 512 BCE, they captured Barca after a nine-month siege. Those who were considered to have been responsible for the murder of Arcesilaus were handed over to Pheretima, Arcesilaus's mother, who had them impaled on the city walls with the members of their families. Afterwards, the Persians were allowed to pass through Cyrene, and Badres was anxious to take the city; but through the refusal of Amasis, who reminded Badres that their objective had been scoped only to the capture of Barca, the opportunity was lost.

This is perhaps the same Badres whom the historian Herodotus mentions as commanding a portion of the Persian army in the expedition of Xerxes I against Greece.
