= Amasis (Persian general) =

Ancient Persian general

Amasis (fl. 550–500 BCE) was a Persian of the tribe of the Maraphii who was sent by Aryandes, the governor of Egypt under Cambyses, at the head of an army to assist Pheretima, the mother of Arcesilaus III, king of Cyrene. Amasis was joined by Badres, who was a Pasargade noble. He took Barca by stratagem and treachery, and made an unsuccessful attempt upon Cyrene. Amasis was able to secure a treaty during this campaign, which he later breached when he captured the Barcaeans. He was then recalled by Aryandes. On its march back, the Persian army suffered severely from the Libyans and a little later it is claimed they appointed the soon to be Egyptian king Amasis II as their leader. An account later cited that Cambyses tried to arrange a marriage with the daughter of Amasis but he ended up attacking Egypt when this diplomatic maneuver failed.

The name "Amasis" is Egyptian; but Harrison and Irwin (2018) suggest that this was the result of the name's being Egyptianized after the fact (from an original such as *Amasrī-, *Amazāta-, etc.), as opposed to an Iranian's actually possessing an Egyptian name.
