= Majid Ahi =

Iranian politician and diplomat

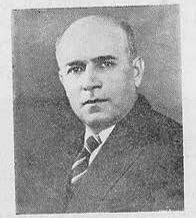

Minister of Justice
- In office 28 April 1941 – 16 July 1942
- Monarchs: Reza Shah; Mohammad Reza Shah
- Prime Minister: Ali Mansur; Mohammad Ali Foroughi; Ali Soheili

Ministry of Roads
- In office 13 June 1926 – 2 June 1926
- Monarch: Mohammad Reza Shah
- Prime Minister: Mahmoud Djam
- In office 7 December 1935 – 28 December 1938

Personal details
- Born: 1886 Tehran, Iran
- Died: 10 August 1946 (aged 60) Tehran, Iran
- Spouse(s): Raissa (KA, Raya)
- Children: Lily Ahi Ayman, Mehri Ahi, Jahangir Ahi
- Education: Moscow State University
- Profession: Diplomat, Politician

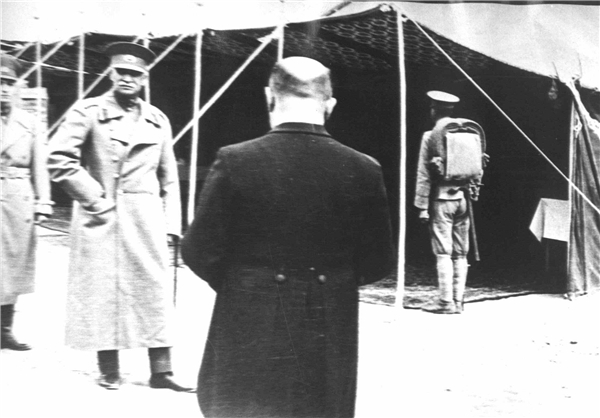
Ahi and Reza Shah during the opening of Kandovan tunnel

Majid Ahi (Ahy)(مجید آهی in Persian, (7 May 1886 – 10 August 1946) was an Iranian politician and diplomat. He served two terms as the head of the Ministry of Justice and one term as the head of the Ministry of Road. Ahi was fluent in Russian and French languages. He was the son of Mirza Abul-Qasem Ahi, a translator at the Russian Empire embassy in Tehran. it was during his tenure in ministry of Road that the construction of the cross-country railway was finished. Ahi in 1940 was appointed to the post of minister of justice in the new cabinet of Ali Mansur. During his ministry, he approved a bill on July 24, 1940, in addition to the release of these prisoners, the possibility of retrial for those who were convicted of other crimes and the restoration of the dignity of these convicts was also provided. His most important challenge in the Ministry of Justice was to return the properties that Reza Shah was forcibly taken from the people. After Foroughi, Ali Soheili also kept Ahi in the Ministry of Justice until 1942 Ahi became Iran's Ambassador to the Soviet Union and until 1946 during World War II, stayed in Moscow.
