= Turko-Iranian =

Turko-Iranian describes several cultural aspects of Iran and other neighbouring countries, involving various combinations of Turkic and Iranian (or Persian) elements.

- The various Turkic and Iranic hybrid traits pertaining to culture, dynasties as well population genetics of various peoples in Central Asia, as well as parts of Southwest Asia and South Asia. (See also: Persianate, Turko-Persian tradition.)
- Oghuz and Karluk countries of Turkic sphere such as Azerbaijan, Turkmenistan, and Uzbekistan whose cultures have been influenced by the Persianate society and who are now residing in a part of the socio-cultural Greater Iran.
- The Turkic speaking minorities of Iran—e.g., Azeris, Qashqais. (See Iranian Turks)
- Turco-Persian society in the 15th to 17th centuries.
- A term for those living on the Iran–Turkey border.
- A term used to refer to the bilateral relations between Turkey and Iran.
