= Nafar =

Turkic ethnic group living primarily in Iran

The Nafar (Azerbaijani: نفر; Persian: نفر), are a Turkic ethnic group living in Fars, Khorasan and Tehran in Iran. Nafar people are Shia Muslim and primarily live in Fars. Although of Turkic origin, the Nafar of Fars have become a mixture of Turkic, Arab, and Lur elements. In 1861-62, the Nafar of Fars became one of the five tribes of the Khamseh tribal confederacy.

Nafar was one of the main tribes involved in the Fars tribal revolt of 1928-1930, in which they managed to conquer Lar and Gerash, but were finally suppressed by the government.
