= Hossein-Ali Bayat =

Iranian politician (1922–1979)

Timsar Hossein-Ali Bayat
- حسینعلی بیات
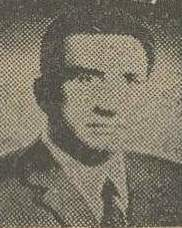
- Bayat in 1975

Member of the Parliament
- In office 8 September 1975 – 15 January 1979
- Constituency: Zanjan

Personal details
- Born: 22 February 1922 Fars, Qajar Iran
- Died: 11 April 1979 (aged 57) Tehran, Iran

Military service
- Allegiance: Pahlavi Iran
- Branch/service: Imperial Iranian Ground Force
- Years of service: 1940s–1975
- Rank: Major General
- Battles/wars: 1962–1964 Tribal Rebellion of Fars; 1967 Kurdish revolt in Iran

Hossein Ali-Bayat (22 February 1922 – 11 April 1979) was an Iranian politician and military officer during the Pahlavi era and a Member of Parliament In Zanjan (1975–1979).
