= Mehri Ahi =

Iranian translator (1922–1988)

- Born: 1922; Tehran, Iran
- Died: 6 March 1988 (aged 65–66)
- Education: Moscow State University
- Occupation: Translator

Mehri Ahi (Persian: مهری آهی, 1922 – 6 March 1988) was an Iranian translator of Russian literature.

== Early life and career ==
Mehri Ahi was born in Tehran. Her father was Majid Ahi. She completed her primary and secondary education at Jandark School in Tehran and graduated from Tehran University with a degree in Persian language and literature. In 1942, her father was appointed as Iran's ambassador to the Soviet Union, and Mehri Ahi went to Russia with her father and studied Russian language and literature at Moscow State University for three years. After returning to Iran in 1948, she went to England and France to continue her studies in this field and studied for seven years and received a doctorate in Russian language.

== Works ==
After finishing her studies, she returned to Iran and started teaching Russian language and literature at the Faculty of Letters and Humanities of the University of Tehran. In addition to teaching, Mehri Ahi was also the head of the Foreign Languages Center of Tehran University. She was also appointed as Iran's representative in the United Nations Commission on the Status of Women for four terms. Mehri Ahi was one of the founding members of the New Way association, the Children's Book Council, the Book Association and the Supreme Council of the Women's Organization of Iran. Mehri Ahi died on 6 March 1988.

== Translations ==
- Fathers and Sons by Ivan Turgenev
- Crime and Punishment by Fyodor Dostoevsky
- Andersen's stories (collection of stories, 1320)
- A Hero of Our Time by Mikhail Lermontov
- The Little Hero (by foreign authors, 1341)
- Everyone has a home
- Idiot by Fyodor Dostoevsky
