= Basseri dialect =

Persian dialect of the Fars province

Basseri
- باصری/باسری
- Pronunciation: Pārsi-e Bāseri
- Native to: Iran
- Region: Fars
- Ethnicity: Basseri Persians
- Language family: Indo-European: Indo-Iranian; Iranian; Western; Southwestern; Persian; Basseri

Language codes
- ISO 639-3: –
- Glottolog: bass1257
- Distribution of Basseri people in Fars

Basseri dialect (Persian: گویش باصری) is a Persian dialect spoken in Fars province by the Basseri people. It is part of the Southwestern Iranian branch of the Indo-Iranian group of Indo-European languages. Basseri dialect consists of many exclusive Persian words with Old and Middle Persian roots and less Arabic Loanwords, which is a consequence of living in the mountains, nomadism and less connection with urban Persians.

== Phonology ==
=== Vowels ===
Basseri dialect has 6 vowels including /æ/, /ɒ/, /o/, /e/, /i/, and /u:/; and also 2 diphthongs including /ow/ and /ey/.

	Front	Back
Close	i	uː
Mid	e	o
Open	æ	ɒ

=== Consonants ===
Basseri Persian has 22 consonants, in contrast with Iranian Persian with 23 consonants. In this dialect, /ʒ/ is merged into /dʒ/.

	Labial	Alveolar	Postalveolar	Palatal	Velar	Uvular	Glottal
Nasal	m	n					
Plosive	p b	t d			k ɡ	q	ʔ
Affricate			tʃ dʒ				
Fricative	f v	s z	ʃ		x		h
Flap or Tap		ɾ					
Approximant		l		j			

== Distribution ==
Basseri dialect is spoken among the Basseries in central Fars province. Counties like Abadeh, Eqlid, Pasargad, Jahrom, Marvdasht, Shiraz, Khorrambid, Larestan, and Sarvestan are among the traditional living range of the Basseri.

== Similarities with English ==
Some words in Basseri dialect are similar to English words.

Basseri	English	standard Persian	st. Persian transcription
Var	Wear	پوشیدن	Pušidan
Jong	Young	جوان	Javān
Pati	Empty	خالی	Xāli
Babe	Baby	عزیزم	Azizam
Babu	Baby	نوزاد	Nowzād
Kap	Cap	کلاه	Kolāh
Sol	Soil	خاک	Xāk
Sekal	Skeleton	استخوان	Ostoxān

== See also ==
- Dialects and varieties of Persian language
