= Safar Ghahremani =

Iranian Politician

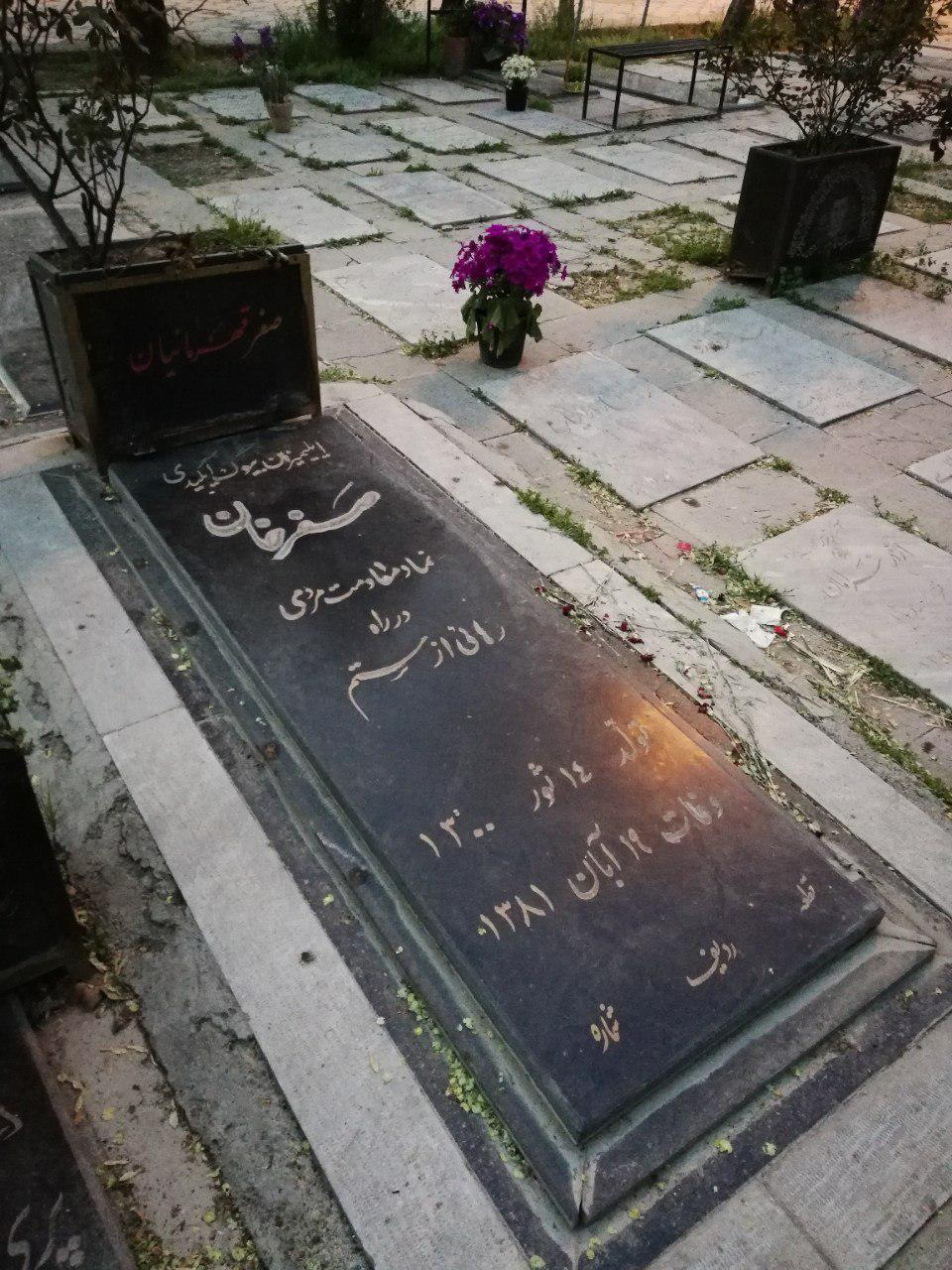
Tomb of Safar Ghahremani

Safar Ghahremani (Turkish Safar Khan) (4 May 1921 – 10 November 2002) was an Iranian leftist dissident and a member of (The Tudeh Party) of Iran, who spent 32 years of his life in prison.

== Early life ==
Ghahremani was born in Ajab Shir, in Iranian Azerbaijan.

== Career ==
He was an Iranian leftist dissident and a member of (The Tudeh Party) of Iran. He spent 32 years in prison, possibly the world's longest serving political prisoner. He was a prominent member of Fedaiyeins, an armed group in Iranian Azerbaijan, that came to power after World War 2. It was crushed by the Shah's regime a year later, killing thousands of people ^{source?} in that region. Safar and his men continued guerilla resistance against the Shah until his arrest in 1947. He was sentenced to death, later changed to life imprisonment. He endured torture for more than 30 years in prison until his release in 1978, on the eve of the Iranian revolution. He returned to Tabriz as thousands greeted him as a national hero.

== Sources ==
- Misagh Parsa: Social Origins of the Iranian Revolution. New Brunswick : Rutgers University Press, 1989. P. 151. Accessed on 7 February 2013.
