= Mohammad khan Zarghami =

Iranian tribal leader 1924–1980

Mohammad Zarghami
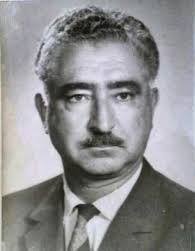

chief of the Basseri
- In office 1936–1946

Personal details
- Born: 22 February 1924
- Died: 31 December 1980 (aged 56) Qasr-e Dasht, Kamin, Marvdasht County, Iran

Mohammad khan Zarghami (Persian: محمد خان ضرغامی; 1924 – 1980) was an Iranian politician and chief of the Basseri tribe in southern Iran. During his leadership, the Basseri flourished, as his time is mentioned by several writers as "The Golden Age of the Basseri Tribe".

Zarghami was among the few tribal leaders of Fars province who was not executed during the Tribal revolts of Fars (1962-1967), as he was imprisoned from 1963 to 1975 in Shiraz, the provincial capital, and then Tehran. In 1975 he was released but forced to remain in Tehran and returned to Fars only after the Iranian Revolution in 1979.
