= Maraphii =

Persian tribe

The Maraphii (Old Persian: Marafiya) were an Iranian tribe from Persis (Parsa in Old Persian) or Persia, in modern southwestern Iran. This tribe was one of the three main and leading Persian tribes (the Persians were and are one of the Iranian peoples) alongside the Maspii and the Pasargadae (from this tribe came the Achaemenid royal family).

== See also ==
- List of ancient Iranian peoples
