= Roza Montazemi =

Iranian cookbook writer (1922–2009)

- Born: Fatemeh Bahrayni; 5 August 1922
- Died: 23 October 2009 (aged 87); Tehran, Iran
- Occupations: Chef and author
- Website: www.rozamontazemi.blogspot.com

Fatemeh Bahrayni (Persian: فاطمه بحرینی; 5 August 1922 – 23 October 2009), better known as Roza Montazemi (Persian: رزا منتظمی), was an Iranian author of cookbooks. Her cookbook Honar-e Aashpazi (The Art of Cooking) has been in publication since 1964–1965 and is now in its 41st edition with 1700 Iranian and non-Iranian recipes.

She was born 5 August 1922. She died in Tehran on 23 October 2009.
