= Tangi Sar =

Tangi Sar تنگی سر
- Village
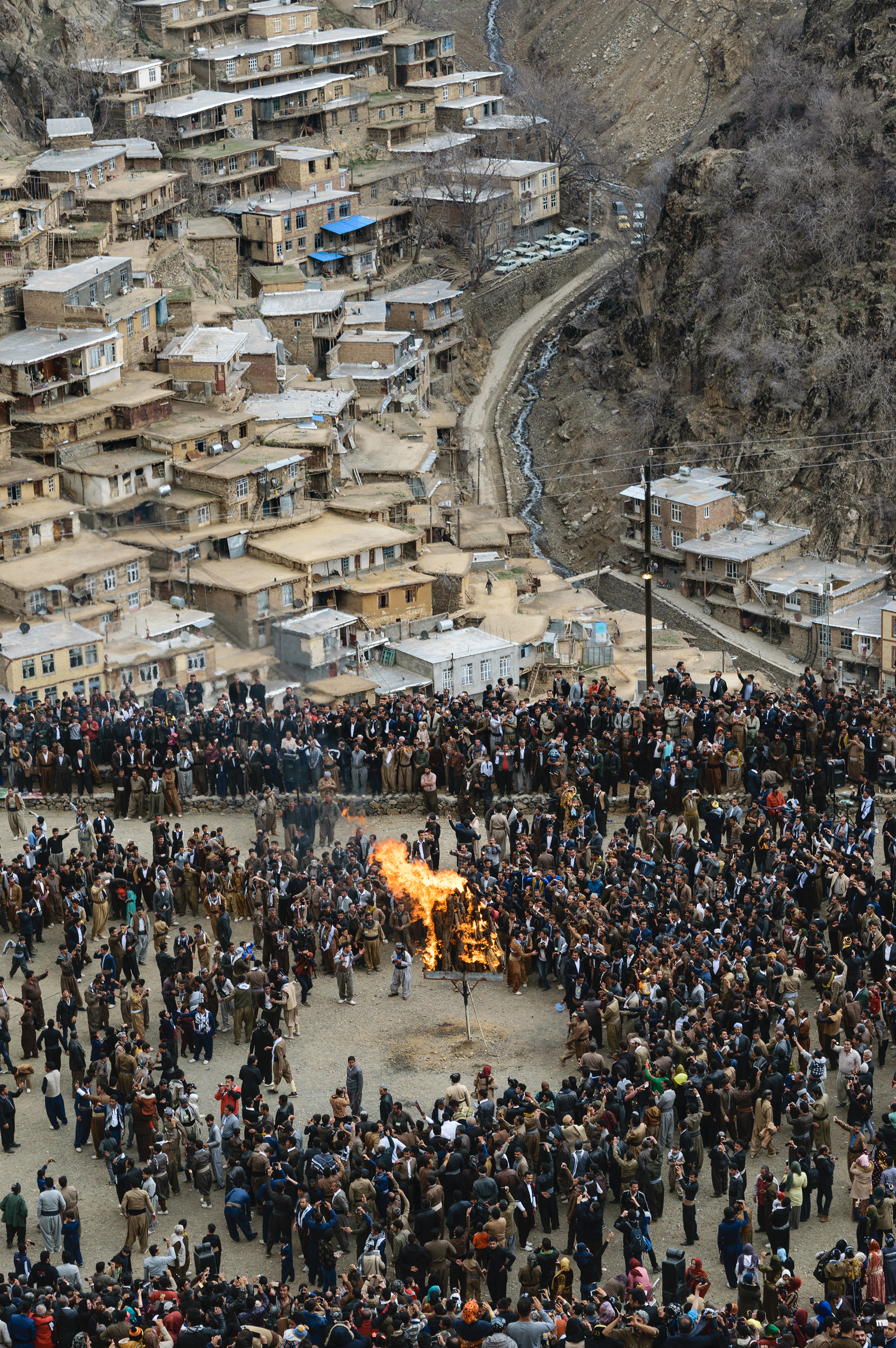
- Nowruz Celebration in Tangisar Village

- Location within Iran
- Coordinates: 35°07′22″N 46°43′25″E
- Country: Iran
- Province: Kurdistan
- County: Kamyaran
- Bakhsh: Muchesh
- Rural District: Gavrud

Population (2006)
  - Total: 1,412
- Time zone: UTC+3:30 (IRST)
  - Summer (DST): UTC+4:30 (IRDT)

Tangi Sar (Persian: تنگی سر, also Romanized as Tangī Sar and Tangīsar; also known as Tangeh Sar) is a village in Gavrud Rural District, Muchesh District, Kamyaran County, Kurdistan Province, Iran. At the 2006 census, its population was 1,412, in 356 families. The village is populated by Kurds.
