= Pasargadae (Persian tribe) =

Persian tribe

The Pasargadae were an Iranian tribe from Persis (Parsa in Old Persian) or Persia Proper, in modern southwestern Iran (this ancient country roughly matches with the modern Iranian provinces of Fars or Pars, Bushehr and western Hormozgan). This tribe was one of the three main and leading Persian tribes (the Persians were and are one of the Iranian peoples) alongside the Maraphii and the Maspii. From the Pasargadae came the Achaemenid royal family. The first capital of the Persian Achaemenid Empire, Pasargadae, was in the land of this tribe and took its name from them.

== Notable Pasargadae ==
- Badres

== See also ==
- List of ancient Iranian peoples
