= Khamseh =

Tribal confederation in Fars, Iran

- Khamseh migration and settlements map

Regions with significant populations
- Fars province, Kerman province, Hormozgan province

Languages
- Arabic, Persian, and Turkish

Religion
- Islam (Shia and Sunni)

Related ethnic groups
- Qizilbash

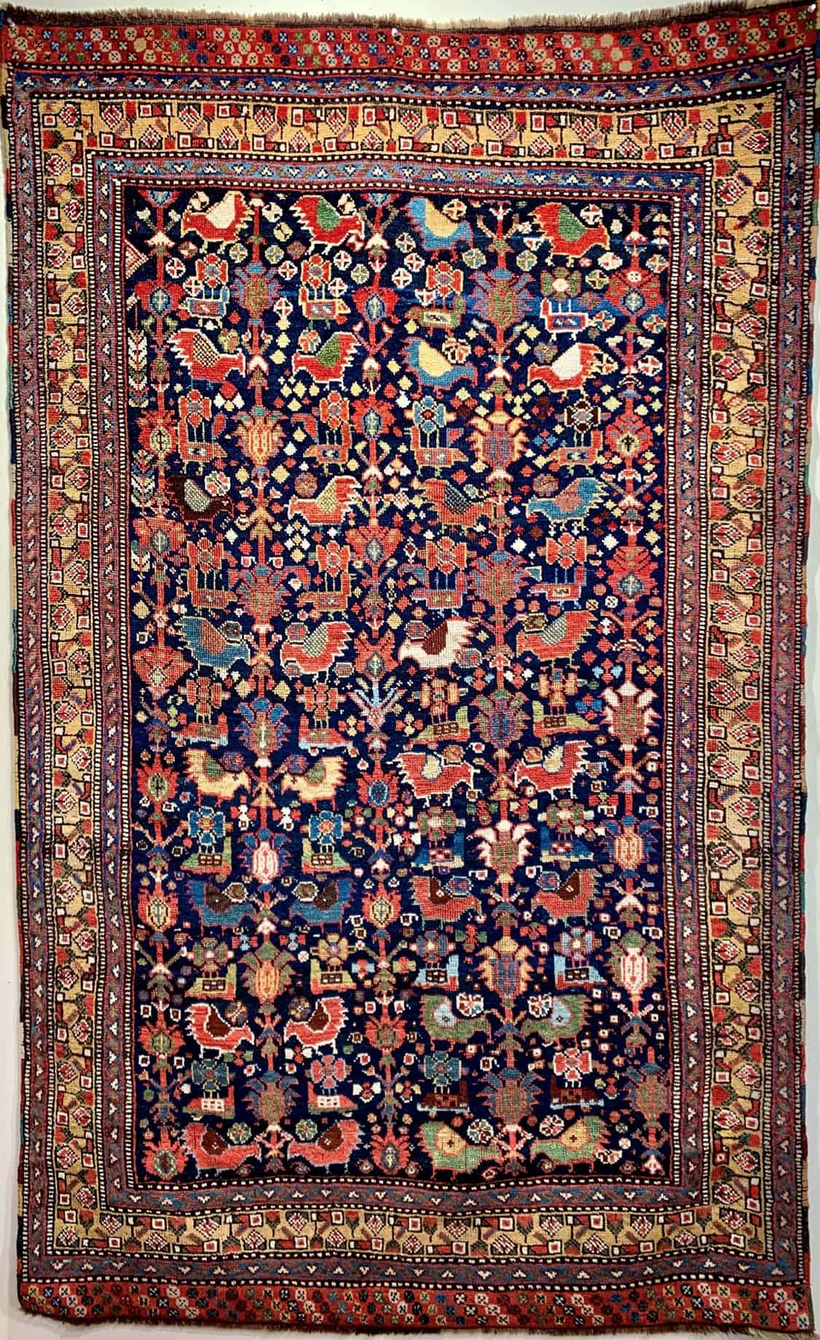
Khamseh "chicken" rug ca. 1880

The Khamseh (Persian: ایلات خمسه) is a tribal confederation in the province of Fars in southwestern Iran. It consists of five tribes, hence its name Khamseh, "the five". The tribes are partly nomadic, Some are Persian speaking Basseri, some are Arabic speaking Arabs, and some are Azerbaijani speaking Turks (Inallu, Baharlu and Nafar).

The history of the Khamseh confederation of tribes starts in 1861–1862 when Naser al-Din Shah Qajar created the Khamseh Tribal Confederation. He combined five existing nomadic tribes, the Arab, Nafar, Baharlu, Inalu, and the Basseri and placed them under the control of the Qavam ol-Molk family. The pattern of forcibly uniting tribes was not a new idea, as the Safavid Shahs previously created homogenous Qizilbash confederations to temper the increasing strength of the Qashqai, who were gaining so much power. The Khamseh tribes were a mixture of Persians, Turks, and Arabs.

== Tribes ==
- Basseri (Persian)
- Inallu (Azerbaijani – Turkic)
- Baharlu (Azerbaijani – Turkic)
- Nafar (Azerbaijani – Turkic)
- Arab (Arabic)

== See also ==
- Demographics of Iran
- Ethnic minorities in Iran
